= Lists of European films =

This is a list of lists of films produced in Europe by country of origin.

== General ==
- List of Albanian films
- List of Andorran films
- List of Belarusian films
- List of Bosnia and Herzegovina films
- List of Cypriot films
- List of Czechoslovak films
- List of Greenlandic films
- List of Icelandic films
- List of Irish films
- List of Lithuanian films
- List of Maltese films
- List of Moldovan films
- List of films from North Macedonia
- List of Romanian films
- List of Serbian films
- List of Slovenian films
- List of Swiss films

== Armenia ==
- List of Armenian films before 1920
- List of Armenian films of the 1920s
- List of Armenian films of the 1930s
- List of Armenian films of the 1940s
- List of Armenian films of the 1950s
- List of Armenian films of the 1960s
- List of Armenian films of the 1970s
- List of Armenian films of the 1980s
- List of Armenian films of the 1990s
- List of Armenian films of the 2000s
- List of Armenian films of the 2010s
- List of Armenian films of the 2020s

== Austria ==
- List of Austrian films before 1920
- List of Austrian films of the 1920s
- List of Austrian films of the 1930s
- List of Austrian films of the 1940s
- List of Austrian films of the 1950s
- List of Austrian films of the 1960s
- List of Austrian films of the 1970s
- List of Austrian films of the 1980s
- List of Austrian films of the 1990s
- List of Austrian films of the 2000s
- List of Austrian films of the 2010s
- List of Austrian films of the 2020s

== Azerbaijan ==
- List of Azerbaijani films before 1920
- List of Azerbaijani films of the 1920s
- List of Azerbaijani films of the 1930s
- List of Azerbaijani films of the 1940s
- List of Azerbaijani films of the 1950s
- List of Azerbaijani films of the 1960s
- List of Azerbaijani films of the 1970s
- List of Azerbaijani films of the 1980s
- List of Azerbaijani films of the 1990s
- List of Azerbaijani films of the 2000s
- List of Azerbaijani films of the 2010s
- List of Azerbaijani films of the 2020s

== Belgium ==
- List of Belgian films before 1960
- List of Belgian films of the 1960s
- List of Belgian films of the 1970s
- List of Belgian films of the 1980s
- List of Belgian films of the 1990s
- List of Belgian films of the 2000s
- List of Belgian films of the 2010s
- List of Belgian films of the 2020s

== Bulgaria ==
- List of Bulgarian films before 1950
- List of Bulgarian films of the 1950s
- List of Bulgarian films of the 1960s
- List of Bulgarian films of the 1970s
- List of Bulgarian films of the 1980s
- List of Bulgarian films of the 1990s
- List of Bulgarian films of the 2000s
- List of Bulgarian films of the 2010s
- List of Bulgarian films of the 2020s

== Croatia ==
- List of Croatian films of the 1950s
- List of Croatian films of the 1960s
- List of Croatian films of the 1970s
- List of Croatian films of the 1980s

== Czech Republic ==
- List of Czech films before 1920
- List of Czech films of the 1920s
- List of Czech films of the 1930s
- List of Czech films of the 1940s
- List of Czech films of the 1950s
- List of Czech films of the 1960s
- List of Czech films of the 1970s
- List of Czech films of the 1980s
- List of Czech films of the 1990s
- List of Czech films of the 2000s
- List of Czech films of the 2010s
- List of Czech films of the 2020s

== Denmark ==
- List of Danish films before 1910
- List of Danish films of the 1910s
- List of Danish films of the 1920s
- List of Danish films of the 1930s
- List of Danish films of the 1940s
- List of Danish films of the 1950s
- List of Danish films of the 1960s
- List of Danish films of the 1970s
- List of Danish films of the 1980s
- List of Danish films of the 1990s
- List of Danish films of the 2000s
- List of Danish films of the 2010s
- List of Danish films of the 2020s

== Estonia ==
- List of Estonian films before 1991
- List of Estonian films since 1991
- List of Estonian animated films
- List of Estonian war films

== Finland ==
- List of Finnish films before 1917
- List of Finnish films of 1917–39
- List of Finnish films of the 1940s
- List of Finnish films of the 1950s
- List of Finnish films of the 1960s
- List of Finnish films of the 1970s
- List of Finnish films of the 1980s
- List of Finnish films of the 1990s
- List of Finnish films of the 2000s
- List of Finnish films of the 2010s
- List of Finnish films of the 2020s

== France ==
- List of French films before 1910
- 1910
- 1911
- 1912
- 1913
- 1914
- 1915
- 1916
- 1917
- 1918
- 1919
- 1920
- 1921
- 1922
- 1923
- 1924
- 1925
- 1926
- 1927
- 1928
- 1929
- 1930
- 1931
- 1932
- 1933
- 1934
- 1935
- 1936
- 1937
- 1938
- 1939
- 1940
- 1941
- 1942
- 1943
- 1944
- 1945
- 1946
- 1947
- 1948
- 1949
- 1950
- 1951
- 1952
- 1953
- 1954
- 1955
- 1956
- 1957
- 1958
- 1959
- 1960
- 1961
- 1962
- 1963
- 1964
- 1965
- 1966
- 1967
- 1968
- 1969
- 1970
- 1971
- 1972
- 1973
- 1974
- 1975
- 1976
- 1977
- 1978
- 1979
- 1980
- 1981
- 1982
- 1983
- 1984
- 1985
- 1986
- 1987
- 1988
- 1989
- 1990
- 1991
- 1992
- 1993
- 1994
- 1995
- 1996
- 1997
- 1998
- 1999
- 2000
- 2001
- 2002
- 2003
- 2004
- 2005
- 2006
- 2007
- 2008
- 2009
- 2010
- 2011
- 2012
- 2013
- 2014
- 2015
- 2016
- 2017
- 2018
- 2019
- 2020
- 2021
- 2022
- 2023
- 2024
- 2025
- 2026
- 2027
- 2028
- 2029

== Georgia ==
- List of Georgian films before 1920
- List of Georgian films of the 1920s
- List of Georgian films of the 1930s
- List of Georgian films of the 1940s
- List of Georgian films of the 1950s
- List of Georgian films of the 1960s
- List of Georgian films of the 1970s
- List of Georgian films of the 1980s
- List of Georgian films of the 1990s
- List of Georgian films of the 2000s
- List of Georgian films of the 2010s
- List of Georgian films of the 2020s

== Germany ==
- List of German films of 1895–1918 (German Empire)
- List of German films of 1919–1932 (Weimar Germany)
- 1919
- 1920
- 1921
- 1922
- 1923
- 1924
- 1925
- 1926
- 1927
- 1928
- 1929
- 1930
- 1931
- 1932
- List of German films of 1933–1945 (Nazi Germany)
- 1933
- 1934
- 1935
- 1936
- 1937
- 1938
- 1939
- 1940
- 1941
- 1942
- 1943
- 1944
- 1945
- List of German films of 1945–1949
- List of German films of the 1950s
- 1950
- 1951
- 1952
- 1953
- 1954
- 1955
- 1956
- 1957
- 1958
- 1959
- List of German films of the 1960s
- 1960
- 1961
- 1962
- 1963
- 1964
- 1965
- 1966
- 1967
- 1968
- 1969
- List of German films of the 1970s
- List of German films of the 1980s
- List of German films of the 1990s
- List of German films of the 2000s
- List of German films of the 2010s
  - List of German films of 2014
- List of German films of the 2020s
  - List of German films of 2023
  - List of German films of 2024
  - List of German films of 2025
- List of East German films

== Greece ==
- List of Greek films before 1940
- List of Greek films of the 1940s
- List of Greek films of the 1950s
- List of Greek films of the 1960s
- List of Greek films of the 1970s
- List of Greek films of the 1980s
- List of Greek films of the 1990s
- List of Greek films of the 2000s
- List of Greek films of the 2010s
- List of Greek films of the 2020s

== Hungary ==
- List of Hungarian films 1901–1947
- List of Hungarian films 1948–1989
- List of Hungarian films since 1990

== Italy ==
- 1910
- 1911
- 1912
- 1913
- 1914
- 1915
- 1916
- 1917
- 1918
- 1919
- 1920
- 1921
- 1922
- 1923
- 1924
- 1925
- 1926
- 1927
- 1928
- 1929
- 1930
- 1931
- 1932
- 1933
- 1934
- 1935
- 1936
- 1937
- 1938
- 1939
- 1940
- 1941
- 1942
- 1943
- 1944
- 1945
- 1946
- 1947
- 1948
- 1949
- 1950
- 1951
- 1952
- 1953
- 1954
- 1955
- 1956
- 1957
- 1958
- 1959
- 1960
- 1961
- 1962
- 1963
- 1964
- 1965
- 1966
- 1967
- 1968
- 1969
- 1970
- 1971
- 1972
- 1973
- 1974
- 1975
- 1976
- 1977
- 1978
- 1979
- 1980
- 1981
- 1982
- 1983
- 1984
- 1985
- 1986
- 1987
- 1988
- 1989
- 1990
- 1991
- 1992
- 1993
- 1994
- 1995
- 1996
- 1997
- 1998
- 1999
- 2000
- 2001
- 2002
- 2003
- 2004
- 2005
- 2006
- 2007
- 2008
- 2009
- 2010
- 2011
- 2012
- 2013
- 2014
- 2015
- 2016
- 2017
- 2018
- 2019
- 2020
- 2021
- 2022
- 2023
- 2024
- 2025
- 2026
- 2027
- 2028
- 2029

== Latvia ==
- List of Latvian films before 1962
- List of Latvian films (1962–1990)
- List of Latvian films of 2014

== Netherlands ==
- List of Dutch films before 1910
- List of Dutch films of the 1910s
- List of Dutch films of the 1920s
- List of Dutch films of the 1930s
- List of Dutch films of the 1940s
- List of Dutch films of the 1950s
- List of Dutch films of the 1960s
- List of Dutch films of the 1970s
- List of Dutch films of the 1980s
- List of Dutch films of the 1990s
- List of Dutch films of the 2000s
- List of Dutch films of the 2010s
- List of Dutch films of the 2020s

== Norway ==
- List of Norwegian films before 1930
- List of Norwegian films of the 1930s
- List of Norwegian films of the 1940s
- List of Norwegian films of the 1950s
- List of Norwegian films of the 1960s
- List of Norwegian films of the 1970s
- List of Norwegian films of the 1980s
- List of Norwegian films of the 1990s
- List of Norwegian films of the 2000s
- List of Norwegian films of the 2010s
- List of Norwegian films of the 2020s

== Poland ==
- List of Polish films before 1930
- List of Polish films of the 1930s
- List of Polish films of the 1940s
- List of Polish films of the 1950s
- List of Polish films of the 1960s
- List of Polish films of the 1970s
- List of Polish films of the 1980s
- List of Polish films of the 1990s
- List of Polish films of the 2000s
- List of Polish films of the 2010s
  - List of Polish films of 2014
  - List of Polish films of 2016
  - List of Polish films of 2017
- List of Polish films of the 2020s
- List of Polish war films
- List of Polish films in the interwar period

== Portugal ==
- List of Portuguese films of the 1930s
- List of Portuguese films of the 1940s
- List of Portuguese films of the 1950s
- List of Portuguese films of the 1960s
- List of Portuguese films of the 1970s
- List of Portuguese films of the 1980s
- List of Portuguese films of the 1990s
- 2000
- 2001
- 2002
- 2003
- 2004
- 2005
- 2006
- 2007
- 2008
- 2009
- 2010
- 2011
- 2012
- 2013
- 2014
- 2015
- 2016
- 2017
- 2018
- 2019
- 2020
- 2021
- 2022
- 2023
- 2024
- 2025

== Russia ==
- List of Russian Empire films

=== Soviet Union ===
- 1917–1921
- 1922
- 1923
- 1924
- 1925
- 1926
- 1927
- 1928
- 1929
- 1930
- 1931
- 1932
- 1933
- 1934
- 1935
- 1936
- 1937
- 1938
- 1939
- 1940
- 1941
- 1942
- 1943
- 1944
- 1945
- 1946
- 1947
- 1948
- 1949
- 1950
- 1951
- 1952
- 1953
- 1954
- 1955
- 1956
- 1957
- 1958
- 1959
- 1960
- 1961
- 1962
- 1963
- 1964
- 1965
- 1966
- 1967
- 1968
- 1969
- 1970
- 1971
- 1972
- 1973
- 1974
- 1975
- 1976
- 1977
- 1978
- 1979
- 1980
- 1981
- 1982
- 1983
- 1984
- 1985
- 1986
- 1987
- 1988
- 1989
- 1990
- 1991

=== Russia ===
- 1992
- 1993
- 1994
- 1995
- 1996
- 1997
- 1998
- 1999
- 2000
- 2001
- 2002
- 2003
- 2004
- 2005
- 2006
- 2007
- 2008
- 2009
- 2010
- 2011
- 2012
- 2013
- 2014
- 2015
- 2016
- 2017
- 2018
- 2019
- 2020
- 2021
- 2022
- 2023
- 2024
- 2025
- 2026
- 2027
- 2028
- 2029

== Slovakia ==
- List of Slovak films of the 2000s
- List of Slovak films of the 2010s
- List of Slovak films of the 2020s

== Spain ==
- List of Spanish films before 1930
- List of Spanish films of the 1930s
- List of Spanish films of the 1940s
- 1950
- 1951
- 1952
- 1953
- 1954
- 1955
- 1956
- 1957
- 1958
- 1959
- 1960
- 1961
- 1962
- 1963
- 1964
- 1965
- 1966
- 1967
- 1968
- 1969
- 1970
- 1971
- 1972
- 1973
- 1974
- 1975
- 1976
- 1977
- 1978
- 1979
- 1980
- 1981
- 1982
- 1983
- 1984
- 1985
- 1986
- 1987
- 1988
- 1989
- 1990
- 1991
- 1992
- 1993
- 1994
- 1995
- 1996
- 1997
- 1998
- 1999
- 2000
- 2001
- 2002
- 2003
- 2004
- 2005
- 2006
- 2007
- 2008
- 2009
- 2010
- 2011
- 2012
- 2013
- 2014
- 2015
- 2016
- 2017
- 2018
- 2019
- 2020
- 2021
- 2022
- 2023
- 2024
- 2025
- 2026

== Sweden ==
- List of Swedish films of the 1910s
- List of Swedish films of the 1920s
- List of Swedish films of the 1930s
- List of Swedish films of the 1940s
- List of Swedish films of the 1950s
- List of Swedish films of the 1960s
- List of Swedish films of the 1970s
- List of Swedish films of the 1980s
- List of Swedish films of the 1990s
- List of Swedish films of the 2000s
- List of Swedish films of the 2010s
- List of Swedish films of the 2020s

== Turkey ==
- List of Turkish films before 1960
- List of Turkish films of the 1960s
- List of Turkish films of the 1970s
  - List of Turkish films of 1970
  - List of Turkish films of 1971
  - List of Turkish films of 1972
  - List of Turkish films of 1973
  - List of Turkish films of 1974
  - List of Turkish films of 1975
  - List of Turkish films of 1976
  - List of Turkish films of 1977
  - List of Turkish films of 1978
  - List of Turkish films of 1979
- List of Turkish films of the 1980s
- List of Turkish films of the 1990s
- List of Turkish films of the 2000s
  - List of Turkish films of 2005
  - List of Turkish films of 2007
  - List of Turkish films of 2008
  - List of Turkish films of 2009
- List of Turkish films of the 2010s
  - List of Turkish films of 2010
  - List of Turkish films of 2011
  - List of Turkish films of 2012
  - List of Turkish films of 2013
  - List of Turkish films of 2014
  - List of Turkish films of 2015
  - List of Turkish films of 2016
  - List of Turkish films of 2017
  - List of Turkish films of 2018
- List of Turkish films of the 2020s
  - List of Turkish films of 2023
  - List of Turkish films of 2024

== Ukraine ==
- List of Ukrainian films of the 1910s
- List of Ukrainian films of the 1920s
- List of Ukrainian films of the 1930s
- List of Ukrainian films of the 1940s
- List of Ukrainian films of the 1950s
- List of Ukrainian films of the 1960s
- List of Ukrainian films of the 1970s
- List of Ukrainian films of the 1980s
- List of Ukrainian films of the 1990s
- List of Ukrainian films of the 2000s
- List of Ukrainian films of the 2010s
- List of Ukrainian films of the 2020s

== United Kingdom ==
- 1920
- 1921
- 1922
- 1923
- 1924
- 1925
- 1926
- 1927
- 1928
- 1929
- 1930
- 1931
- 1932
- 1933
- 1934
- 1935
- 1936
- 1937
- 1938
- 1939
- 1940
- 1941
- 1942
- 1943
- 1944
- 1945
- 1946
- 1947
- 1948
- 1949
- 1950
- 1951
- 1952
- 1953
- 1954
- 1955
- 1956
- 1957
- 1958
- 1959
- 1960
- 1961
- 1962
- 1963
- 1964
- 1965
- 1966
- 1967
- 1968
- 1969
- 1970
- 1971
- 1972
- 1973
- 1974
- 1975
- 1976
- 1977
- 1978
- 1979
- 1980
- 1981
- 1982
- 1983
- 1984
- 1985
- 1986
- 1987
- 1988
- 1989
- 1990
- 1991
- 1992
- 1993
- 1994
- 1995
- 1996
- 1997
- 1998
- 1999
- 2000
- 2001
- 2002
- 2003
- 2004
- 2005
- 2006
- 2007
- 2008
- 2009
- 2010
- 2011
- 2012
- 2013
- 2014
- 2015
- 2016
- 2017
- 2018
- 2019
- 2020
- 2021
- 2022
- 2023
- 2024
- 2025
- 2026
- 2027
- 2028
- 2029

== See also ==
- European cinema
- World cinema
- Cinema Europe: The Other Hollywood
- Cinema of the Faroe Islands
- Cinema of Luxembourg
- Culture of Montenegro
- Cinema of Yugoslavia
