= Shadow of War =

Shadow of War or variation, may refer to:

== Literature ==
- Larry Bond's Red Dragon Rising: Shadows of War, 2009 novel by Larry Bond
- "In the Shadows of War", a 2008 publication of Because I Am a Girl
- "Shadows of War", a 2009 publication of Small Arms Survey
- Shadows of War, a 1998 BattleTech novel; see List of BattleTech novels
- Shadows of War, a 2005 novel by Robert Gandt
- Shadows of War, a 2019 anthology by Robert Westall

== Music ==
- Shadows of War, 1986 album by 'Loudness'
- "Shadows of War" (song), a 1986 song by 'Loudness' off the album Lightning Strikes (Loudness album)
- "Shadows of War" (song), a 2016 song by 'Lords of Black' off the album II (Lords of Black album)

== Video games ==
- Middle-earth: Shadow of War, a 2017 videogame
- AdventureQuest Worlds: Shadows of War, videogame
- Liyla and the Shadows of War, 2016 videogame
- Shadow Wars, 2014 videogame from DeNA

== Other uses ==
- "The Shadows of War" (episode), a 2005 TV episode of Gundam Seed Destiny; see List of Mobile Suit Gundam SEED Destiny episodes
- "Shadows of War" (episode), an episode of the 1915 serial The New Exploits of Elaine
- Shadows of War (Ukrainian: Тіні війни), 1993 film; see List of Ukrainian films of the 1990s

== See also ==
- Shadow war (disambiguation)
- Chronicles of the Shadow War, a LucasFilm fictional universe built from Willow
- Forsaken World: War of Shadows, 2012 videogame
- A War of Shadows, 1952 non-fiction book by W. Stanley Moss
- Wars of Light and Shadow, a fantasy novel series by Janny Wurts
