= Shadow war =

Shadow war may refer to:

== Games ==
- GURPS Voodoo: The Shadow War, a 1995 role-playing game
- Cutthroat: The Shadow Wars, a 1988 role-playing game

=== Videogames ===
- SpellForce 2: Shadow Wars, 2006 videogame
- MAG: Shadow War, 2010 videogame
- Tom Clancy's Ghost Recon: Shadow Wars, 2011 videogame
- Stickman Legends: Shadow War, 2017 videogame; see List of most-downloaded Google Play applications

== Other uses ==
- Shadow Wars (Babylon 5), a number of wars in the Babylon 5 fictional universe
- "The Shadow War!" (episode), 2018 season 1 episode 23 of DuckTales; see List of DuckTales (2017 TV series) episodes
- Shadow War (DC Comics), a comic book story arc
- Shadow Wars (book), a 2003 non-fiction book by David Pugliese
- A form of unconventional warfare that uses local criminal elements and with an emphasis on covert activities

== See also ==
- Shadow Warriors (disambiguation)
- Shadow of War (disambiguation)
- Chronicles of the Shadow War, a LucasFilm fictional universe built from Willow
- Forsaken World: War of Shadows, 2012 videogame
- A War of Shadows, 1952 non-fiction book by W. Stanley Moss
- Wars of Light and Shadow, a fantasy novel series by Janny Wurts
