= List of Ukrainian films of the 1920s =

== 1920s ==
=== 1926 ===
- Love's Berries, directed by Oleksandr Dovzhenko (silent film)
- Taras Tyiasylo, directed by Petro Chardynin (silent film)

=== 1927 ===
- Two Days, directed by Georgi Stabovoi (silent film)
- Order na arest, directed by Georgi Tasin (silent film)

=== 1928 ===
- Zvenigora, directed by Oleksandr Dovzhenko (silent film)
- The Night Coachman, directed by Georgi Tasin (silent film)
- The Eleventh Year, directed by Dzyha Vertov (documentary film)
- Laughter Through Tears, directed by Grigory Gricher (silent film)

=== 1929 ===
- Arsenal, directed by Oleksandr Dovzhenko (silent film)
- The Self Seeker, directed by Mykola Shpykovskyi (silent film)
- Man with a Movie Camera, directed by Dzyha Vertov (documentary film)
- In Spring, directed by Mikhail Kaufman (documentary film)
- Bread, directed by Mykola Shpykovskyi (silent film)
