= Bread (1930 film) =

1930 Ukrainian Soviet film

- Ukrainian: Хліб
- Directed by: Mykola Shpykovskyi
- Written by: Volodymyr Yaroshenko
- Starring: Luka Lyashenko; Fedir Hamaliy; Dmytro Kapka
- Cinematography: Oleksiy Pankratiev
- Music by: Port Mone
- Production company: All-Ukrainian Photo Cinema Administration
- Distributed by: National Oleksandr Dovzhenko Film Centre
- Release dates: 4 March 1930 (Soviet Union); 13 September 2013 (Ukraine)
- Running time: 44 minutes
- Country: Soviet Union
- Languages: Silent film Ukrainian intertitles

Bread (Ukrainian: Хліб, romanized: Khlib), also known as The Year 1920 (Ukrainian: Тисяча дев'ятсот двадцятий рік, romanized: Tysyacha dev'yatsot dvadtsyatyy rik), is a 1930 Ukrainian Soviet silent film directed by Mykola Shpykovskyi.

Due to its critical depiction of collectivisation in Ukraine, soon after its completion, it was banned in the Soviet Union by the State Committee for Cinematography. After spending more than 80 years in the archives of the Russian State Film Fund, the National Oleksandr Dovzhenko Film Centre rediscovered and restored the film in 2012 and re-released it in 2013. It received positive reviews both before it was banned and after it was re-released.

== Plot ==
A Red Army soldier returns to his native village after the Russian Civil War and plans to create a collective farm. The land for this farm is taken from the "kulaks", and the grain for sowing is taken from the townspeople. The main conflict is the fight against the kulaks, and the secondary one is the confrontation of the main character with his grandfather. The latter does not believe that the stolen grain will sprout on the stolen land. But when it does sprout, the grandfather sides with his son - he becomes convinced: for the sake of the common good, one can break written and unwritten laws.

== Cast ==
- Luka Lyashenko as a Red Army veteran
- Sofia Smyrnova as a peasant woman
- Fedir Hamaliy as a kulak
- Dmytro Kapka as an old man
- Zoya Korneva as a rural woman

== Reception ==
Contemporary reviews of the film were positive. A month and a half before the film was banned, the magazine Kino compared it favourably to Arsenal and called it a "great cultural achievement". Modern critics note the meticulous cinematography of Oleksiy Pankratiev, the actors' realistic performances and Shpykovsky's innovative editing techniques. The film is today considered an avant-garde epic. In its 2021 list of the 100 best films in the history of Ukrainian cinema, the National Oleksandr Dovzhenko Film Centre placed Bread at #25.

== Ban ==
Shpykovsky's previous film, The Self Seeker, had already been banned by the State Committee for Cinematography in early 1929. When production on Bread was completed in October 1929, the film was sent to the committee for review. The film premiered on 4 March 1930, but only three days later, it was likewise banned on 7 March. Even after revisions, the committee upheld the ban in 1931.

The committee complained that the film did not depict the liquidation of the kulaks or the deployment of collectivisation. However, given that the film focused on the events of the immediate post-revolutionary years, some film critics believe this was not the real reason for the ban, holding it more likely that it was banned for its depiction of the brutality of collectivisation.

== Parallels with Earth ==
Bread was filmed, edited, and released almost simultaneously with Earth by Oleksandr Dovzhenko. They have the same conflict, shared actors, and similar scenes; both films were also banned by the State Committee for Cinematography. During the period of De-Stalinization in the 1950s, Earth was "rehabilitated", largely due to its success in Europe. In contrast, Bread was held for over 80 years in the archives of the Russian State Film Fund, until it was discovered there by the National Oleksandr Dovzhenko Film Centre.

== Restoration and release ==
In 2012, the film was restored by the National Oleksandr Dovzhenko Film Centre. On 13 September 2013, the film premiered at the Mute Nights Festival, with musical accompaniment by the Belarusian instrumental trio Port Mone. Later that year, the film was screened at the opening of Gogolfest in Kyiv. The Ukrainian State Film Agency called the film "the greatest archival film discovery of the 2000s".
