= José Nascimento =

José Nascimento may refer to:

- José Nascimento (film director) (born 1947), Portuguese film director
- José Nascimento (basketball) (born 1978), Angolan basketball player
- José Nascimento (handballer) (born 1966), Brazilian handball player
