= List of Andorran films =

Andorra is a small European country between Spain and France.

== A ==
- Amor idiota (2004)
- Andorra pintoresca (1909)

== B ==
- The Burning Cold (2022)

== D ==
- Don't Take the Name of God in Vain (1999)

== F ==
- The Final Game (2022)

== L ==
- La Perversa caricia de Satán (1975)
- Llana negra (2021)

== M ==
- El Mundo de Pau Casals (1973)

== N ==
- Nick (2014)
- No pronunciarás el nombre de Dios en vano (1999)

== P ==
- Le Paria (1969)
- La Perversa caricia de Satán (1976)
- Pròfugs (2021)

== S ==
- Sergi Mas (documentary) (2017)
