= Shadow Warriors =

Shadow Warriors or Shadow Warrior may refer to:

== Books ==
- Shadow Warriors: Inside the Special Forces, a 2002 book by Tom Clancy
- Shadow Warriors (Breuer book), a book by William B. Breuer
- Shadow Warriors, a book by Kenneth R. Timmerman

== Film and television ==
- Kage no Gundan: Hattori Hanzo a.k.a. Shadow Warriors, a film precursor to the 1980 TV series
- Kagemusha (Shadow Warrior), a 1980 film directed by Akira Kurosawa
- "Part Five: Shadow Warrior", an episode of Ahsoka
- Shadow Warrior, an episode of Star Wars: The Clone Wars
- Shadow Warriors, a 1995 American science fiction film
- Shadow Warriors (TV series), a 1980 Japanese TV series starring Sonny Chiba

== Video games ==
- Shadow Warrior, a first-person shooter video game series
  - Shadow Warrior (1997 video game), the first game in the series
  - Shadow Warrior (2013 video game), a reboot of the series
- Shadow Warriors (arcade), a European name of Ninja Gaiden arcade game
- Shadow Warriors (NES video game), a European name of Ninja Gaiden video game for Nintendo Entertainment System
- Shadow Warriors (Game Boy video game), a European name of Ninja Gaiden Shadow video game for Game Boy

== Other ==
- Shadow Warriors (band), a side-project by Sam Totman of DragonForce
- "Shadow Warriors", the nickname of a United States Air Force network squadron

== See also ==
- shadow war (disambiguation)
- Legend of the Shadow Warriors, a single-player roleplaying gamebook
