= List of Portuguese films of 2000 =

A list of Portuguese films that were first released in 2000.

Release date	Title	Director	Cast	Genre	Notes	Ref
March 31	Too Late	José Nascimento				
April 19	April Captains	Maria de Medeiros	Stefano Accorsi, Joaquim de Almeida		Screened at the 2000 Cannes Film Festival	
September 8	In Vanda's Room	Pedro Costa	Vanda Duarte			
September 22	Nights	Cláudia Tomaz				
October 20	Phantom	João Pedro Rodrigues				
November 17	Word and Utopia	Manoel de Oliveira				
November 29	Moon Fish	José Álvaro Morais				
December 1	Camarate	Luís Filipe Rocha				
	Snow White	João César Monteiro				

== See also ==
- 2000 in Portugal
