= The Luminous Life =

2025 Portuguese drama film

- Promotional poster
- Portuguese: A Vida Luminosa
- Directed by: João Rosas
- Written by: João Rosas
- Produced by: Pedro Borges
- Starring: Francisco Melo; Cécile Matignon; Federica Balbi; Gemma Tria; Ângela Ramos; Francisca Alarcão
- Cinematography: Paulo Menezes
- Edited by: Luís Miguel Correia
- Production companies: Midas Filmes; Les Films de l'Après-midi
- Distributed by: Midas Filmes
- Release dates: 7 May 2025 (IndieLisboa International Independent Film Festival); 26 June 2025 (Portugal)
- Running time: 99 minutes
- Countries: Portugal; France
- Language: Portuguese

The Luminous Life (Portuguese: A Vida Luminosa) is a 2025 Portuguese drama film written and directed by João Rosas in his feature directorial debut. It was released theatrically on 26 June 2025. It had its premiere at the IndieLisboa International Independent Film Festival on 7 May 2025. It was released theatrically on 26 June 2025.

== Premise ==
The film follows Nicolau, a 24-year-old in Lisbon, who, while juggling short-term jobs, dreaming of a music career, and nursing a recent heartbreak, doesn’t feel like celebrating his birthday with a big party.

== Cast ==
- Francisco Melo as Nicolau
- Cécile Matignon as Chloé
- Federica Balbi as Anna
- Gemma Tria as Emma
- Ângela Ramos as Matilde
- Francisca Alarcão as Mariana
- Margarida Dias as Inês

== Release ==
The Luminous Life had its premiere at IndieLisboa International Independent Film Festival on 7 May 2025. It competed for Crystal Globe with other eleven feature films at the 59th Karlovy Vary International Film Festival on 5 July 2025. On 26 June 2025, it was released in Portuguese cinemas. It also made it to the 'Meeting Point' slate of the 70th Valladolid International Film Festival. It competed in the Golden Olive tree Competition at the Lecce European Film Festival on 20 November 2025. It competed for the Crystal Globe at the 59th Karlovy Vary International Film Festival on 5 July 2025.

In February 2026, it will be presented for its United States premiere in the feature films section of the 41st Santa Barbara International Film Festival.

It was released theatrically on 26 June 2025.

== Reception ==
Vladan Petkovic reviewing the film at the Karlovy Vary International Film Festival for Cineuropa wrote "João Rosas’ debut feature offers a gently ironic and subtly rebellious tone, presenting a relaxed viewing experience as it pairs his familiar protagonist with Lisbon, which plays a central role in the story."

== Awards and nominations ==
Year	Award	Category	Recipient(s)	Result	Ref
2025	Karlovy Vary International Film Festival	Crystal Globe Grand Prix	The Luminous Life	Nominated	

== See also ==
- List of Portuguese films of 2025
