= List of Portuguese films of the 1970s =

A list of films produced in the Cinema of Portugal ordered by year of release in the 1970s. For an alphabetical list of Portuguese films see Category:Portuguese films

== 1970s ==
Title	Director	Cast	Genre	Notes
1970
O Cerco	António da Cunha Telles			
Nojo aos Cães	António de Macedo			
1971
Traição Inverosímil	Augusto Fraga			
1972
O Recado	José Fonseca e Costa			
Pedro Só (Just Peter)	Alfredo Tropa			
Tombs of the Blind Dead	Amando de Ossorio	Lone Fleming, Cesar Burner	Horror	Portuguese\Spanish co-production
Uma Abelha na Chuva (A Bee in the Rain)	Fernando Lopes		Drama	
1973
A Promessa	António de Macedo			Entered into the 1973 Cannes Film Festival
1974
Sofia e a Educação Sexual	Eduardo Geada			
1975
Que Farei Com Esta Espada?	João César Monteiro			
Benilde ou a Virgem Mãe (Benilde or the Virgin Mother)	Manoel de Oliveira			
Brandos Costumes (Gentle Costume / Mild Manners)	Alberto Seixas Santos			
Deus, Pátria, Autoridade (God, Homeland, Authority)	Rui Simões		Documentary	
1976
A Fuga	Luís Filipe Rocha			
1977
As Ruínas no Interior	José de Sá Caetano			
Os Demónios de Alcácer Quibir	José Fonseca e Costa			
1978
O Rei das Berlengas	Artur Semedo			
Veredas (Trails)	João César Monteiro			
1979
Amor de Perdição (Ill-Fated Love)	Manoel de Oliveira			
