= List of Portuguese films of 2001 =

A list of Portuguese films that were first released in 2001.

Release date	Title	Director	Cast	Genre	Notes	Ref
January 12	The Heart's Root	Paulo Rocha				
May 4	Ganhar a Vida	João Canijo	Rita Blanco, Adriano Luz		Screened at the 2001 Cannes Film Festival	
May 9	I'm Going Home	Manoel de Oliveira	Michel Piccoli, Catherine Deneuve, John Malkovich, Leonor Silveira		Entered into the 2001 Cannes Film Festival.	
July 20	As Fragile as the World	Rita Azevedo Gomes				
October 12	The Window (Dom António Mix)	Edgar Pêra				
November 23	Quem És Tu?	João Botelho				
November 30	Rasganço	Raquel Freire				

== See also ==
- 2001 in Portugal
