= List of Ukrainian films of the 1950s =

- 1951 Тарас Шевченко / Taras Shevchenko, directed by Ihor Savchenko
- 1952 В степах України / In the Steppes of Ukraine, directed by Tymofiy Levchuk
- 1952 Украдене щастя / Stolen Happiness, directed by Hnat Yura (by the drama of Ivan Franko)
- 1953 Мартин Боруля / Martyn Borulia, directed by Oleksiy Shvachko
- 1955 Іван Франко / Ivan Franko, directed by Tymofiy Levchuk
- 1959 Григорій Сковорода / Hryhoriy Shovoroda, directed by Ivan Kavaleridze
