= List of Ukrainian films of the 1980s =

- 1980 Чорна курка, або Підземні жителі / Black Chicken or the Underground Inhabitants, directed by Viktor Hres
- 1981 Така пізня, така тепла осінь / Such Late, Such Warm Autumn, directed by Ivan Mykolaichuk
- 1982 Повернення Баттерфляй / The Return of Batterfly, directed by Oleh Fialko
- 1983 Колесо історії / Wheel of History, directed by Stanislav Klymenko
- 1983 Вир / Whirlpool, directed by Stanislav Klymenko
- 1984 Украдене щастя / Stolen Happiness, directed by Yuriy Tkachenko (by the drama of Ivan Franko)
- 1985 Вклонись до землі / Earth-reaching Bowing, directed by Leonid Osyka
- 1986 І в звуках пам'ять відгукнеться... / And Memory Will Recall in the Sounds..., directed by Tymofiy Levchuk
- 1987 Данило — князь Галицький / Danylo — Kniaz of Halychyna, directed by Yaroslav Lupiy
- 1988 Чорна Долина / Black Valley, directed by Halyna Horpynchenko
- 1989 Гори димлять / The Mountains are Smoking, directed by Boris Nebieridze (by the story of Yaroslav Halan)
- 1989 Небилиці про Івана / Fables about Ivan, directed by Borys Ivchenko
- 1989 Камінна душа / Stone Soul, directed by Stanislav Klymenko
- 1989 В Далеку Путь / Taking Off, directed by Oles Yanchuk (short film)
