= Deus, Pátria, Autoridade =

1975 Portuguese film by Rui Simões

Deus, Pátria, Autoridade (God, Homeland, Authority) is a 1975 Portuguese film by the filmmaker Rui Simões. It is a feature-length documentary film made up of historic newsreels made by the Estado Novo dictatorship, especially under António de Oliveira Salazar.

== Summary ==
- Script: Rui Simões
- Director: Rui Simões
- Producers: Instituto Português de Cinema and RTP
- Format: 35 mm black and white
- Genre: Documentary (historical)
- Duration: 103 min
- Distribution: Instituto Português de Cinema
- Premiere: Lisbon, at the Universal Cinema, 21 February 1976

== Synopsis ==
The film's title quotes from well-known lines from a 1936 speech by Salazar in which he described three cornerstone dogmas of his government with the words: "We do not discuss God and Virtue. We do not discuss the Homeland and its history. We do not discuss Authority and its prestige." ("Não discutimos Deus e a virtude. Não discutimos a Pátria e a sua história. Não discutimos a Autoridade e o seu prestígio.") The film is made principally out of archival material and footage from newsreels. The narrative is voiced over the montage, deconstructing the fascist ideology illuminated in Salazar's speech and guiding the viewer through the film.

The film explains the development and ideology of the regime, from a social perspective of class struggle. Major themes are the history and functional principles of Portuguese society from the end of the Monarchy in 1910, the ideology of the Salazar dictatorship, the support of the Roman Catholic Church, the mechanisms of oppression, and the Portuguese Colonial War, up to the Carnation Revolution on 25 April 1974.

== Production and reception ==
The Portuguese filmmaker Rui Simões directed, wrote the screenplay, and produced the film for the film collective Cooperativa Virver. The work was financed mainly by the Portuguese state Instituto Português de Cinema (today the Instituto do Cinema e do Audiovisual, ICA), with the participation of the public television broadcaster Rádio e Televisão de Portugal (RTP).

The film premiered at the Universal Cinema in Lisbon, on 21 February 1976, and enjoyed a successful run with 22,188 tickets sold. However, the film was frequently shown outside of regular cinemas, on a wide variety of occasions, probably reaching several hundred thousand people.

Costa do Castelo Filmes released the film on VHS videocassette and on DVD in 2006; later, Real Ficção re-released the film on DVD.

== Credits ==
- Script: Rui Simões
- Director: Rui Simões
- Director's Assistants: Manuela Serra and Francisco Henriques
- Producers: Instituto Português de Cinema and RTP
- Collaborators: Artur da Costa, Alice Pinto, Noémia Delgado, José Pedro Andrade dos Santos, J.M. Diogo, Raymond Fromont, Matilde Ferreira
- Animation: Geneviève Antoine and Mário Jorge
- Photography: Acácio de Almeida, Gérard Collet, José Reynès, Francisco Henriques
- Sound directors: Luís Martins e Rui Simões
- Music: Carmina Burana de Carl Orff
- Sound effects and mixing: Rui Simões
- Montage: Dominique Rolin
- Assistant on the Montage: Manuela Serra
- Recording: 1975
- Film studio: Ulyssea Filme
- Sound studio: Nacional Filmes
- Archival materials: Ulyssea Filme, RTP, Emissora Nacional
- Format: 35 mm black and white
- Genre: Documentary (historical)
- Duration: 103 min
- Distribution: Instituto Português de Cinema
- Premiere: Lisbon, at the Universal Cinema, 21 February 1976

== Festivals and exhibitions ==
- 28ª Mostra Brasileira de Cinema (2004)
- 31ª Mostra Internacional de Cinema in São Paulo
- VI Jornadas Independentistas Galegas (2007)

== See also ==
- Novo Cinema
- Political cinema
- Cinema of Portugal
