= Too Late (2000 film) =

2000 Portuguese film by José Nascimento

- Directed by: José Nascimento
- Starring: Ana Moreira
- Release date: 2000
- Country: Portugal
- Language: Portuguese

Too Late (Portuguese: Tarde Demais) is a 2000 Portuguese film directed by José Nascimento. The script is based on a true story. It was Portugal's submission to the 73rd Academy Awards for the Academy Award for Best Foreign Language Film, but was not accepted as a nominee.

== See also ==
- Cinema of Portugal
- List of submissions to the 73rd Academy Awards for Best Foreign Language Film
