= List of Ukrainian films of the 1910s =

- 1910 Шемелько-денщик або Хохол наплутав / Shemelko-Denshchyk, directed by Oleksandr Ostroukhov-Arbo
- 1912 Запорізька січ / Zaporizhian Sich, directed by Danylo Sakhnenko
- 1912 Любов Андрія / Andriy's Love, directed by Danylo Sakhnenko
- 1912 Kastus Kalinovskiy, directed by Ivan Kavaleridze
- 1913 Полтава / Poltava, directed by Danylo Sakhnenko
- 1913 Жизнь Евреев в Палестине / The Life of the Jews in Palestine / חיי היהודים בארץ ישראל / La vie des Juifs en Palestine, directed by Noah Sokolovsky
