= Raquel Freire =

Portuguese film director, screenwriter and novelist

- Born: 22 June 1973 (age 52); Porto, Portugal
- Occupations: Film director, screenwriter, novelist

Raquel Freire (born 22 June 1973, in Porto) is a Portuguese film director, screenwriter and novelist.

== Career ==
In 2014, she released the film Transiberic Love which is a love story set in modern times showing how one can be an activist within globalised social media and still have some integrity.

In 2013 she published the book Trans Iberic Love, which in 2020 was one of the titles chosen to be part of Sara Barros Leitão's reading project "Heróides - Clube do Livro Feminista."

In 2020 she participated in the first edition of Queer Fest, in Lisbon, in the discussion table "Queer As Intersectionality."

Raquel's films can be found on the streaming platform MUBI.

== Works ==
=== Films ===
- Rio Vermelho
- Rasganço (2001)
- Veneno Cura (2008)
- Vida Queima (2013)

=== Novel ===
- Trans Iberic Love (2013)
