= List of Mobile Suit Gundam SEED Destiny episodes =

Cover of the first DVD volume by Bandai Visual.

Mobile Suit Gundam SEED Destiny is the anime sequel to Mobile Suit Gundam SEED produced by Sunrise and directed by Mitsuo Fukuda. The series spanned 50 episodes, aired in Japan from October 9, 2004, to October 1, 2005, on the Japan News Network television stations Tokyo Broadcasting System and Mainichi Broadcasting System. Set two years after the original Mobile Suit Gundam SEED, the plot follows the new character Shinn Asuka, a soldier from ZAFT, composed of humans born genetically enhanced labelled as Coordinators. As ZAFT is about to enter into another war against the regular human race, the Naturals, the series focuses on Shinn's as well as various returning characters' involvement in the war.

A year after its prequel's finale, and on December 25, 2005, a director's cut version of the final episode called "Final Plus" aired with additional scenes and an epilogue. Gundam SEED Destiny's first English broadcast began on Canada's YTV starting on March 9, 2007 and it is also available in the United States on Comcast's Anime Selects On Demand network. In November 2012, Sunrise announced through the last remastered episode of Gundam SEED a Gundam SEED Destiny HD remaster project.

Eight pieces of music were used for the original series. The four opening themes were "Ignited" (ignited -イグナイテッド-, Igunaiteddo) by T.M.Revolution from one to thirteen, "Pride" by High and Mighty Color from fourteen to twenty four, "Bokutachi no Yukue" (僕たちの行方; lit. 'Our Whereabouts') by Hitomi Takahashi from twenty five to thirty seven, and "Wings Of Words" by Chemistry towards the end. The ending themes are "Reason" by Nami Tamaki from episodes one to thirteen, "Life Goes On" by Mika Arisaka from fourteen to twenty five, "I Wanna Go To A Place..." by Rie Fu from twenty six to thirty seven, and "Kimi wa Boku ni Niteiru" (君は僕に似ている; lit. 'You are Similar to Me') towards the end, by pop duo See-Saw. The English TV dub used "Pride" in place of "Ignited", but used all other original openings. The TV dub also retained the ending themes. The 2013–2014 HD remaster of Gundam SEED Destiny replace "Reason" with "Result" (a theme originally used for the first Special Edition movie, also by Nami Tamaki) for episodes 12 and 13, and "Wings of Words" with T.M. Revolution's "Vestige" (vestige -ヴェスティージ-, Vesutīji), a theme originally used only as the opening for the "Final Plus" edition of episode 50.

The series was collected in a total of thirteen DVD volumes that were released in Japan from February 24, 2005 A DVD box from the television series that also included the special episode was released on April 9, 2010. The North American release does not include the special episode entitled "Edited" and thus it was not aired on English-speaking networks. "Edited" is an alternate version of episode 6, "The End of the World", and used bits and pieces of scenes of the original episode 6. The DVDs came with a specially made parody episode of Gundam SEED titled Gundam SEED Character Theatre. The series was released on twelve DVDs in North America in uncut bilingual format between March 14, 2006, and January 8, 2008. The Final Plus episode was announced to have been licensed in July 2007, with a single DVD released on April 15, 2008. Two "Anime Legends" DVD boxes volumes from the series were later released on January 13 and May 19, 2009, .

== Episode list ==
Phase no.	Title	Directed by	Written by	Original release date	English air date
1	"Angry Eyes"; Transliteration: "Ikareru Hitomi" (Japanese: 怒れる瞳)	Akira Toba	Chiaki Morosawa	October 9, 2004	March 9, 2007
In C.E. 71, during the Bloody Valentine War, second-generation Coordinator, Shinn Asuka, loses his family to the Battle of Orb, leaving him with a deep-seated hatred for Orb. Two years later, Cagalli Yula Athha, now Orb's Chief Representative, is visiting ZAFT's newly established "Armory One" PLANT with Athrun Zala (using the pseudonym "Alex Dino" in public) to have a secret meeting with PLANT's Supreme Council Chairman Gilbert Durandal, concerned about the resurfacing of disturbances on both sides. Just then, the alarm blares as a mysterious group launches destructive attacks on the launch ceremony of the new ZAFT battleship LHM-BB01 Minerva. The group, taking advantage of the confusion, steals the new Gundams just before their roll-out. Cagalli is at a loss with the fighting happening again before her eyes. To protect Cagalli, Athrun grabs her and jumps into the cockpit of a ZGMF-1000 ZAKU Warrior and fights the three hijacked mobile suits, ZGMF-X24S Chaos Gundam, ZGMF-X31S Abyss Gundam, and ZGMF-X88S Gaia Gundam. But Athrun is cornered by them, being outnumbered and outclassed in spec. At the last extremity, another new machine jumps in between both parties: the ZGMF-X56S Impulse Gundam, piloted by Shinn, now a ZAFT elite soldier.
2	"Those Who Call for War"; Transliteration: "Tatakai o Yobu Mono" (Japanese: 戦いを呼ぶもの)	Susumu Yamaguchi	Chiaki Morosawa	October 16, 2004	March 16, 2007
As the Chaos, Abyss, and Gaia continue to clash against the Sword Impulse and the ZAKU Warrior, around the same time, outside Armory One, the Earth Alliance ship Girty Lue of the Phantom Pain special forces, which launched the hijack group, commences operations under the orders of Captain Neo Roanoke, making a surprise attack and sinking ZAFT's escort fleet, while two GAT-02L2 Dagger L's destroyed the spaceport. The strike team, Sting Oakley, Auel Neider, and Stella Loussier, begin their retreat in response to ZAFT's counterattack. After Cagalli is injured from the battle, forcing Athrun to retreat, Shinn and Rey Za Burrel in his ZGMF-1001 ZAKU Phantom chase and engage the three Gundams in combat. However, the stolen mobile suits escape by blowing a hole in the colony's wall, while Neo, piloting the TS-MA4F Exus, awaits them in space. Talia Gladys, captain of the Minerva, decides to launch the ship to deal with the situation.
3	"Warning Shots"; Transliteration: "Yochō no Hōka" (Japanese: 予兆の砲火)	Masahiro Takada	Chiaki Morosawa	October 23, 2004	March 23, 2007
While fighting Neo in space in pursuit of the stolen Gundams, Shinn and Rey are saved by the Minerva, which interposes between them and begins attacking the enemy ship, Girty Lue, which escapes with the stolen Gundams by detaching some of the ship's propellant tanks and detonating them. Also on board the Minerva are Athrun and Cagalli, who landed on the ship seeking medical attention. They are taken into custody by Lunamaria Hawke, pilot of a custom-colored red ZGMF-1000/A1 Gunner ZAKU Warrior, who seems to recognize Athrun. Durandal apologizes for his discourtesy, as he couldn't return the two to Orb due to the urgent situation. He then offers a tour of the ship with him as a gesture of good faith between PLANT and Orb. Witnessing the capabilities of the Gundam on board the Minerva as being far more destructive than expected, Cagalli becomes enraged. Shinn overreacts to her words and vents his anger on her. Alerts suddenly blare throughout the ship as the Girty Lue is detected on sensors, forcing the Minerva into battle.
4	"Stardust Battlefield"; Transliteration: "Hoshikuzu no Senjō" (Japanese: 星屑の戦場)	Akihiko Nishiyama	Kazuho Hyōdō; Chiaki Morosawa	November 6, 2004	March 30, 2007
Shinn in the Blast Impulse and Lunamaria in her Gunner ZAKU Warrior enter the Debris Belt pursuing the Girty Lue. However, just as Talia and Athrun realize the plan is a decoy courtesy of Neo, the three stolen Gundams emerge from hiding and attack the Minerva team. The Girty Lue reappears from hiding as well and attacks the Minerva from behind. ZAFT's forces are divided, and the Minerva is unable to use most of its weapons due to the high density of rocks surrounding it. Neo uses those asteroids to block the ship's path. Following Athrun's suggestion, the Minerva fires at close range, using the blast's momentum to break free of the field and counterattack, damaging the Girty Lue. However, the Minerva is without sufficient power to pursue the Alliance, effectively ending the battle in a stalemate. Meanwhile, in a different area of space, the remains of Junius Seven have moved out of a stable orbit.
5	"Scars That Won't Heal"; Transliteration: "Ienu Kizuato" (Japanese: 癒えぬ傷痕)	Akira Toba	Yūichi Nomura; Chiaki Morosawa	November 13, 2004	April 6, 2007
The Minerva receives an urgent message about Junius Seven rapidly drifting from its stable orbit and is now on an extinction-level collision course with Earth. Given the seriousness of the situation, PLANT dispatches a crushing team led by Yzak Joule, with the Minerva following. Amid the situation, tensions rise between Cagalli and Shinn, as the latter blames the Athha family for his family's deaths. Meanwhile, the Earth Alliance also detects Junius Seven's movement, and the Blue Cosmos, taking advantage of this situation, with its new leader, Lord Djibril, schemes its next move against PLANT and the Coordinators. Yzak's team arrives at the scene and deploys their Meteor Breaker equipment to destroy the remains of Junius Seven. Just then, mysterious ZGMF-1017M2 GINN High Maneuver Type II units suddenly attack the working team, indicating that Junius' movement is intentional. The Minerva deploys MS units to assist the working team, including Athrun Zala, who volunteered to help.
6	"The End of the World"; Transliteration: "Sekai no Owaru Toki" (Japanese: 世界の終わる時)	Akira Yoshimura	Yūichi Nomura; Chiaki Morosawa	November 20, 2004	April 13, 2007
Shinn, Rey, Lunamaria, and Athrun launch from the Minerva to protect Yzak's working team by engaging the terrorists attacking them. Suddenly, the Girty Lue intervenes and deploys Chaos, Abyss, and Gaia to join the fight, causing the battle to devolve into anarchy. Athrun and Yzak overwhelm the enemies in battle while Shinn watches, awestruck at the abilities who fought during the previous war. Thanks to their efforts, the working units install the Meteor Breakers, and Junius Seven begins breaking apart. The pieces, however, are still large enough for an extinction-level event, so the Minerva decides to enter Earth's atmosphere in order to break them further. In the meantime, Athrun and Shinn decide to try activating the remaining breakers, but the terrorists attempt a suicide attack to stop them. They discover the terrorists, those who lost family members to the Bloody Valentine Incident, live with the spirit of the late Patrick Zala's extremist vision of eradicating the Naturals. Athrun and Shinn begin descending into the atmosphere with the fragments, shocked and confused.
7	"Land of Confusion"; Transliteration: "Konmei no Daichi" (Japanese: 混迷の大地)	Katsuyoshi Yatabe	Hiroshi Ōnogi; Chiaki Morosawa	November 27, 2004	April 20, 2007
To finish fragmenting Junius Seven, the Minerva continues with its atmospheric re-entry and makes a rough landing in the Pacific Ocean, but not before Shinn and Athrun arrive back. Despite their efforts, however, the remaining Junius Seven fragments still make landfall, obliterating countless cities and landmarks and killing millions of people. Following the incident, the Blue Cosmos and Lord Djibril present evidence, via Neo's earlier pictures, of the terrorists planting thrusters on Junius Seven to the Cosmos' parent body, "Logos," supposedly implicating PLANT in the disaster, and schemes to unite humanity in the Blue Cosmos' goal of destroying the Coordinators. Meanwhile, the Minerva, originally destined for ZAFT's Carpentaria Base, heads to Orb to repair the damage done to the ship and to drop off Cagalli. Along the shore somewhere in Orb, Kira Yamato, who has lived in seclusion with Lacus Clyne at Reverend Malchio's orphanage since the Bloody Valentine War, senses a storm of fate approaching.
8	"Junction"; Transliteration: "Jankushon" (Japanese: ジャンクション)	Masahiro Takada	Kazuho Hyōdō; Chiaki Morosawa	December 4, 2004	April 27, 2007
The Minerva sails into Orb's Morgenröte docking facility on Onogoro Island for repair and resupply. Once docked, Cagalli returns to government affairs as Orb's representative and is informed of the inextricable standoffs and heightened tension between the Earth Alliance and PLANT following the Junius Seven incident from Orb's Prime Minister, Unato Ema Seiran, and the other leaders, and that Orb is faced with the decision of where they should stand. In the meantime, as Talia meets LCAM-01XA Archangel captain Murrue Ramius, the crew enjoys their brief time off, as Athrun reunites with Kira and Lacus and starts to search for the path he should choose once more. With his mind made up, Athrun gives Cagalli a promise ring and takes off to join Durandal in the hopes of averting another war between the Earth Alliance and PLANT. Wrestling with his confused thoughts, Shinn returns to the scene of his family's deaths, where he meets Kira and Lacus.
9	"Bared Fangs"; Transliteration: "Ogoreru Kiba" (Japanese: 驕れる牙)	Akihiko Nishiyama	Shigeru Morita; Chiaki Morosawa	December 11, 2004	May 4, 2007
The newly-formed World Security Treaty Organization overwhelmingly blames ZAFT for the Junius Seven incident. The mainstream opinion on Earth favors military action against ZAFT, while at the Alliance's lunar base, preparations for another war with the PLANTs progress. At the PLANT Supreme Council meeting to observe the Earth Alliance's list of demands, the debate becomes heated, with Durandal insisting on negotiating for peace, while PLANT's National Defense Commission decides to mobilize ZAFT to defend the PLANTs against the Alliance's forthcoming attack. Meanwhile, Athrun arrives at PLANT and asks to meet with Durandal to appeal for peace negotiations; however, the Earth Alliance fleet continues its advance as it declares war on PLANT. Yzak and Dearka attempt to intercept, but they realize they're fighting decoys. A secret attack fleet of GAT-04 Windam mobile suits fires their nuclear missiles at the PLANTs, only to be intercepted by ZAFT deploying its new weapon prototype, the Neutron Stampeder. Meanwhile, as Athrun is waiting for Durandal, he is suddenly hugged by a lookalike of Lacus, confusing Athrun.
10	"A Father's Spell"; Transliteration: "Chichi no Jubaku" (Japanese: 父の呪縛)	Akira Toba	Yūichi Nomura; Chiaki Morosawa	December 18, 2004	May 11, 2007
Athrun is aghast to hear from Durandal that the Earth Alliance attempted to make another nuclear strike toward PLANT. He decides to forego his pseudonym and go by his real name. Denying Patrick's radical beliefs, he emotionally pleads with Durandal for peace, and Durandal gently reasons with him. Meanwhile, across the PLANTs, citizens are outraged that the Alliance would attack them with nuclear weapons again and demand that PLANT retaliate. Suddenly, a familiar voice calls out from every TV monitor: a girl named Meer Campbell, speaking on a TV broadcast, posing as Lacus, urging for calm. Durandal confesses to Athrun that he arranged the fake Lacus, then takes Athrun to a military hangar, unveils the new ZGMF-X23S Saviour Gundam, entrusts it to Athrun, and enlists him as a FAITH member, claiming that he wants Athrun in a position of power when necessity arises, precisely because of the emotional distress Patrick's actions caused and because Athrun seeks peace more than anyone else. Deep in thought, Meer invites Athrun to dinner, who says she doesn't mind and is happy being Lacus to help the PLANTs.
11	"The Chosen Path"; Transliteration: "Erabishi Michi" (Japanese: 選びし道)	Akira Yoshimura	Yūichi Nomura; Chiaki Morosawa	December 25, 2004	May 18, 2007
In response to the nuclear attack, for "self-defense" and "war escalation prevention" reasons, the PLANT Supreme Council decides to attack the Earth Alliance surrounding Gibraltar and Carpentaria. At the same time, the Orb government is about to engage to an alliance with the Atlantic Federation, despite Cagalli's protests. However, when asked to consider the safety of Orb's citizens above all else, she has no choice but to concede. In the meantime, Athrun reunites with Yzak and Dearka, who were sent to escort and monitor him during his stay at PLANT. While visiting the grave of their former comrades, Yzak urges Athrun to return to ZAFT. Former ZAFT commander, Andrew Waltfeld, observes the PLANT's drop operations and the responding alliance between Orb and the Atlantic Federation, and sends an anonymous warning to the Minerva. Talia decides to leave Orb for Carpentaria the following morning, where — unbeknownst to her — the Alliance's fleet is waiting just outside Orb's territorial waters. Cagalli is disappointed with herself for not being strong enough, but Yuna gently tells her that he'll always be there for her as her husband, much to her shock.
12	"Blood in the Water"; Transliteration: "Chi ni Somaru Umi" (Japanese: 血に染まる海)	Masahiro Takada	Hiroshi Ōnogi; Chiaki Morosawa	December 25, 2004	May 25, 2007
While leaving Orb, the Minerva is blocked in the line of retreat by fleets from both the Earth Alliance and Orb and is forced to make a frontal breakthrough. Lunamaria and Rey are posted as defense on the ship's deck, with Shinn on offense as he intercepts a squad of Windams. While the Minerva is able to defend itself, when the Alliance's new mobile armor YMAF-X6BD Zamza-Zah is launched, the tide of the battle starts to turn against the Minerva. The Zamza-Zah creates a positron reflector shield and blocks the blow of Minerva's "Tannhäuser" positron blaster cannon and corners the Force Impulse, grabbing and destroying its right leg. At the last moment, Shinn activates his SEED Mode and has the Deuterion beam from the Minerva recharge the Force Impulse's battery, allowing Shinn to destroy the Zamza-Zah effortlessly. He then docks with a new Leg Flyer and switches to the Sword Silhouette and shreds the Alliance's ships apart. Everyone, including the crew of the Minerva and Orb, is amazed and speechless as they witness the Shinn's overwhelming power. Meanwhile, at PLANT, Durandal presents Athrun with the insignia of ZAFT's elite special forces, FAITH, as Athrun confirms his determination to fight for peace again and departs for the Minerva.
13	"Resurrected Wings"; Transliteration: "Yomigaeru Tsubasa" (Japanese: よみがえる翼)	Katsuyoshi Yatabe	Kazuho Hyōdō; Chiaki Morosawa	January 8, 2005	June 1, 2007
Although heavily damaged, the Minerva is out of crisis and sets sail for Carpentaria. While Cagalli is lost in deep thought, Yuna approaches her, urging her to accept their arranged marriage for alliance purposes and to forget Athrun and Kira, who are Coordinators living in a different world from the Naturals. As the situation develops, Andrew informs Murrue that he, Kira, and Lacus are contemplating leaving Orb for PLANT, as the upcoming Orb-Atlantic Federation alliance will no longer make Orb safe for Coordinators. Andrew invites her to join them, believing Durandal would accept Naturals immigrating to PLANT. That night, a special forces squad assaults the mansion. Andrew and Murrue fend off the soldiers and discover that not only are they Coordinators outfitted with military equipment, but their mission is to assassinate Lacus. The group is led into a fortified underground shelter, to which the special forces squad resorts to using their UMF/SSO-3 ASH mobile suits to breach it. Lacus is forced to hesitatingly reveal the fully repaired and sealed-away ZGMF-X10A Freedom Gundam to Kira. Piloting the Freedom once again, Kira launches into battle, where the Freedom's might and Kira's superior piloting quickly neutralize the enemy forces. Although the pilots are kept alive, they sacrifice themselves by activating their mobile suits' self-destruct function. After the battle, Kira overlooks the smoking remnants of destroyed mobile suits and shows determination to head into battle once again.
14	"Flight to Tomorrow"; Transliteration: "Ashita e no Tabidachi" (Japanese: 明日への出航)	Akira Toba	Shigeru Morita; Chiaki Morosawa	January 15, 2005	June 8, 2007
Following their victory over the assassins, Kira, Lacus, Murrue, and Andrew try to figure out who sent the attackers. Andrew notes that the assassins used the ASH, a new amphibious mobile suit available only to ZAFT forces. Believing that someone from PLANT sent the assassins, the group cancels their plans to emigrate. Soon after, Cagalli's caretaker, Merna, arrives and delivers a letter to Kira announcing that Cagalli has been arranged to marry Yuna and is currently residing at the Seiran family estate. Cagalli states in the letter that she is marrying Yuna to fulfill her responsibility as Orb's representative, and includes Athrun's ring inside the envelope. While staring at the ring, which Cagalli asks Kira to return to Athrun, he makes a certain decision to save Cagalli. On the day of the wedding, Kira and Murrue gather several of the Archangel's former crew, and launch it to the wedding. Kira, in the Freedom, departs from the Archangel into the city. Cagalli is stunned by the sudden appearance of the Freedom at the ceremony. Kira grabs her and returns to the Archangel, which disappears into the sea.
15	"Return to the Battlefield"; Transliteration: "Senjō e no Kikan" (Japanese: 戦場への帰還)	Akihiko Nishiyama	Hiroshi Ōnogi; Chiaki Morosawa	January 22, 2005	June 15, 2007
In order to link up with the Minerva, Athrun heads to Orb on the Saviour Gundam. However, having allied themselves with the Atlantic Federation, Orb refuses Athrun's entry and attacks him with MVF-M11C Murasame units. He hears from an Orb government official that the Minerva has already left, and Athrun decides to pursue it. Meanwhile, on the Archangel, an angry Cagalli questions Kira and the others as to why she was kidnapped from her wedding ceremony. Kira returns Athrun's ring to Cagalli and speaks gently to her about her beliefs, prompting Cagalli to break down and sob in Kira's arms. Elsewhere, Athrun reunites with the Minerva and her crew, now docked in Carpentaria base. Athrun is initially dumbfounded to hear that Cagalli was kidnapped in the middle of her wedding, but feels relieved when he realizes the culprit behind the kidnapping was Kira. Athrun hands over new orders and insignia for FAITH from Chairman Durandal to Talia. The Minerva's new mission is to assist ZAFT troops in capturing the Suez base at Gibraltar. As the Minerva heads to a new battlefield, Neo captures the battleship on radar, and his bold smile broadens.
16	"Struggle in the Indian Ocean"; Transliteration: "Indo-yō no Shitō" (Japanese: インド洋の死闘)	Masahiro Takada	Yūichi Nomura; Chiaki Morosawa	February 5, 2005	June 29, 2007
The Minerva departs from Carpentaria for Gibraltar, being escorted by the Vosgulov-class submarine Nyiragongo. Meanwhile, Neo borrows dozens of Windams from the squad deployed to the Earth Alliance's under-construction Indian Ocean base. With the reinforcements, Neo attacks the Minerva alongside Sting's Chaos. Athrun and Shinn intercept, but it turns out to be a diversion. The Abyss, which had gone underwater, approaches the Minerva. Meanwhile, Shinn leaves the line of battle chasing Gaia, which suddenly appeared from the coastline, and happens upon the construction site. There, the local citizens have been enslaved to build the Alliance's military base. Rey and Lunamaria are unfamiliar with underwater warfare, and Auel destroys the Nyiragongo with Abyss with hardly a backward glance. Blinded by rage upon discovering the construction site, Shinn rampages across the base, destroying the Alliance's facilities and their tanks. Although this was intended to free the citizens, it was, in a sense, a massacre, prompting Athrun to reprimand Shinn for making decisions on his own and for not learning how to use his power.
17	"The Soldier's Life"; Transliteration: "Senshi no Jōken" (Japanese: 戦士の条件)	Akira Yoshimura	Kazuho Hyōdō; Chiaki Morosawa	February 12, 2005	July 6, 2007
While the Archangel finds shelter with the Kingdom of Scandinavia, Murrue and the others discuss their future, due to the innumerable unknowns about the current situation following the "Break The World" Incident. With the assassination attempt on Lacus and the appearance of fake Lacus, the group grows skeptical of Durandal. Cagalli worries about Athrun, whose whereabouts remain unknown after heading to PLANT. Elsewhere, the Minerva docks at ZAFT's Mahamul base: the front line to invade Suez. The plan is to seize the Earth Alliance's Lohengrin Gate in the Gulnahan Ravine, which is positioned to protect their power plant. Since the only path to Suez is through the ravine, it is defended by a large positron blaster cannon and a YMAG-X7F Gells-Ghe, a mobile armor equipped with a positron reflector shield. As the Minerva is ordered to head to Gibraltar, they need to break through. Talia speculates about Durandal's true intention in directing the Minerva to Mahamul, but remains determined to give the plan her all. Meanwhile, Shinn and Athrun once again clash over their disagreements. The former still stubbornly thinks he made the right judgment call in destroying the base and freeing the enslaved citizens; although Athrun can relate, he orders Shinn not to let power get to him, lest he lose himself in it.
18	"Attack the Lohengrin"; Transliteration: "Rōengurin o Ute!" (Japanese: ローエングリンを討て!)	Taiki Nishimura	Shigeru Morita; Chiaki Morosawa	February 19, 2005	July 13, 2007
With the help of local resistance member Conille Almeta, Minerva's mission with ZAFT's Ruddle Team is to take out the Alliance's strategic base, including the huge positron cannon. Athrun is assigned command and orders Shinn to a pivotal role in the mission. Shinn accepts out of rebellion, but when he hears from Conille how the townspeople suffered from ZAFT's previous failed attack on the Lohengrin Gate, he pulls himself together. On the day of the operation, solely relying only on Conille's data, Shinn's YFX-M56S Core Splendor flies through the pitch-black tunnel, followed by the Chest Flyer and Leg Flyer. While the Minerva distracts the Gells-Ghe, Shinn exits the narrow tunnel by blasting his way out, where he immediately combines with the flyers to form the Impulse and approaches the cannon base that is starting to retreat into the underground shelter. Shinn throws one of the enemy's incapacitated Dagger Ls into the hole before the shutter closes. The Dagger L explodes and destroys the Lohengrin, setting off a chain reaction that destroys the entire base. Hailed as a hero, Shinn is cheered by the citizens.
19	"The Hidden Truth"; Transliteration: "Mienai Shinjitsu" (Japanese: 見えない真実)	Akira Toba	Hiroyuki Yoshino; Chiaki Morosawa	February 26, 2005	July 20, 2007
After destroying the Earth Alliance's Gulnahan base, the Minerva arrives at ZAFT's base at the Black Sea coastal city of Diocuia. The fake Lacus, Meer, is giving a concert, where thunderous cheers from the soldiers greet her. Backstage, Talia unexpectedly sees Chairman Durandal. Talia tries to find out Durandal's intent in coming to Earth at a time like this, who purposefully evades the question to greet Shinn, Lunamaria, and Athrun. As the conversation progresses, the topic gradually shifts from the current situation to the state of the war and what it means for certain people: Durandal says some wish for war for economic reasons; others, like Logos — Blue Cosmos' parent body — view war as a profitable industry that controls the world from behind the scenes. After the concert, Meer joins the Minerva crew and rejoices at seeing Athrun again. That night, Durandal asks whether he knows the whereabouts of the Archangel, as he is looking for the real Lacus. He tells Athrun to contact him if he hears from her, while Athrun tells him to do the same if Durandal finds her before him.
20	"Past" (Japanese: PAST)	Masahiro Takada	Chiaki Morosawa	March 5, 2005	July 27, 2007
The First Alliance-PLANT War began when Shinn Asuka was 12. At the time, Shinn and his family had emigrated to the neutral Orb Union and were leading calm, everyday lives despite the war. But as the conflict progressed, it eventually approached Orb. With the odds stacked against them as the war dragged on, the Earth Alliance repeatedly requested Orb's assistance, but Orb refused, believing in its neutral ideology. In response, the Alliance attacked Orb. Shinn lost his entire family in the Battle of Orb, and in the aftermath, Orb officer Todaka gently called out to him. Afterward, the scene of the war moved out into space before an eventual peace treaty between the Earth Alliance and PLANT had been signed. Since Shinn had no relatives, Todaka arranged for him to relocate to the PLANTs, where he joined ZAFT to gain power and prevent anyone from ever taking what is precious to him again.
21	"Wandering Eyes"; Transliteration: "Samayou Hitomi" (Japanese: さまよう眸)	Akihiko Nishiyama	Chiaki Morosawa	March 12, 2005	August 3, 2007
The crew of the Minerva is given a vacation, staying at a hotel in Diocuia. The next morning, Athrun wakes to find Meer asleep beside him, a sight Lunamaria witnesses. Meanwhile, Durandal had assigned a new FAITH member, Heine Westenfluss, to the Minerva before leaving Diocuia. The crew spends their day off each in their own way. Shinn rides a motorcycle out of Diocuia, as Durandal's words about war from the previous night have made him feel uneasy. Sometime later, he takes a walk along the coastline absent-mindedly when a dancing girl falls over a cliff. He hastily dives into the water in a desperate attempt to save her, who — unbeknownst to him — is none other than Gaia pilot Stella Loussier. At the mention of the word "death", Stella panics. After rescuing her, Shinn and Stella spend time together until Athrun arrives and rescues them in response to Shinn's emergency beacon, followed by Stella's teammates, Sting and Auel. Without revealing their identities, Sting and Auel retrieve Stella, who feels sad at saying goodbye to Shinn, while Shinn cries out that he will see her again in the future.
22	"Sword of the Blue Skies"; Transliteration: "Sōten no Ken" (Japanese: 蒼天の剣)	Katsuyoshi Yatabe	Hiroshi Ōnogi; Chiaki Morosawa	March 19, 2005	August 10, 2007
The tense relationship between Athrun and Shinn gradually shifts thanks to Heine's friendly personality and advice. Meanwhile, as a result of her and other "Extended" Naturals going through a regeneration chamber that also removes "hindrances" in the way of battle, Stella's memories of Shinn are wiped out, including having no memory of the handkerchief that Shinn used to tend her leg wound. Elsewhere, Orb's fleet, commanded by Yuna, is heading toward Suez to meet with Neo after the government succumbed to pressure from the Alliance — which is starting to lose support — and approved troop deployment, upsetting Athrun, who also gets an understanding of Shinn's hatred toward Orb: Shinn loved the peaceful Orb, but as soon as it changed via war, his attitude toward Orb changed with it. Both forces clash at the Dardanelles, where Shinn and Athrun sortie, and the Minerva's "Tannhäuser" positron blaster cannon aims for the entire Orb fleet. Out of nowhere, Kira and the Freedom appears and shoots down the "Tannhäuser" just before it was about to fire.
23	"The Shadows of War"; Transliteration: "Senka no Kage" (Japanese: 戦火の蔭)	Masahiro Takada	Hiroshi Ōnogi; Chiaki Morosawa	March 26, 2005	August 31, 2007
After Kira intervenes in the battle, Cagalli launches in her MBF-02 Strike Rouge from the Archangel, identifying herself as the representative of Orb, demanding they cease all hostilities and retreat. While everyone else on the battlefield is stunned, Yuna loses his composure, declares Cagalli an impostor, and resumes the battle. Todaka reluctantly follows Yuna's command and orders Orb's warships to attack the Strike Rouge with missiles, which Kira is able to intercept successfully. Taking the opportunity to destroy the damaged Minerva, Phantom Pain's and Earth Alliance's mobile suits attack it. Shinn and Athrun intercept while Heine in his new custom-colored ZGMF-2000 GOUF Ignited, Lunamaria, and Rey launch in their mobile suits to strengthen the Minerva's defenses. With Cagalli's pleas left unheard, Kira asks Andrew to keep both Cagalli and the Archangel safe and advances to neutralize all three parties' weapons. Andrew launches in his custom Murasame and escorts Cagalli back to the Archangel. During the chaos, Athrun attempts to communicate with Kira but cannot break through due to radio interference. Kira damages Stella's Gaia and slices off the right arm of Heine's GOUF Ignited. Enraged, Stella lunges towards Freedom just as Heine's GOUF Ignited unknowingly wanders into Stella's line of attack, killing Heine. Having taken significant damage to their forces, Phantom Pain launches a retreat signal, and the forces withdraw. Kira and the Archangel take their leave as Athrun and Shinn can only gnash their teeth out of grief for Heine's death as they stare at the smoking remains of the battlefield.
24	"Differing Views"; Transliteration: "Surechigau Shisen" (Japanese: すれ違う視線)	Akira Yoshimura	Hiroyuki Yoshino; Chiaki Morosawa	April 2, 2005	September 7, 2007
Following the Battle of Dardanelles, the Minerva is severely damaged and docks at Port Turkios on the Sea of Marmara for repairs and resupply. Shinn angrily blames Kira and the Archangel for Heine's death, while Athrun, after gaining permission from Talia, decides to directly ask the Archangel crew to explain their motives and decision to get involved in the battle. Seeking a clue to the Archangel's whereabouts, Athrun visits a nearby town and spots former Archangel crew member Miriallia Haw, who is now a photojournalist and covered photographing the battle. She agrees to arrange contact with the Archangel as Lunamaria secretly watches from afar. Meanwhile, Shinn and Rey receive a new reconnaissance assignment to investigate an abandoned Earth Alliance research facility. During the investigation, however, Rey suffers a severe panic attack. Elsewhere, Athrun in the Saviour is finally reunited with Kira and Cagalli, but the two parties claim to have seen and heard different things, leaving them at cross-purposes. Kira then mentions the assassination attempt on Lacus by a gang of Coordinators, which shakes Athrun.
25	"The Place of Sin"; Transliteration: "Tsumi no Arika" (Japanese: 罪の在処)	Akira Toba	Hiroyuki Yoshino; Chiaki Morosawa	April 9, 2005	September 14, 2007
Despite raising suspicions about Durandal and ZAFT, Athrun's trust in him remains, telling Kira and Cagalli to focus on stopping Orb from getting further involved in the war before returning to the Minerva. Meanwhile, the Minerva receives an emergency message from Shinn and hurries to the facility. After taking in the hysterical Rey, Shinn, Athrun, Talia, and Arthur Trine — Minerva's second-in-command — re-enter the facility and discover numerous strange-looking pieces of equipment and several corpses of the research staff and children. The team discovers that the facility was used by the Earth Alliance to create "Extended" Naturals: experimented Naturals designed to compete with Coordinators, prompting Shinn to tremble with rage. In the meantime, Neo is informed that the Minerva is investigating the lab, which in turn causes Auel to suffer a panic attack when he hears the word "mother". He also says the word "die," which causes Stella to run amok and depart alone in the Gaia for the lab, where Shinn and Athrun intercept her and engage her in combat. After defeating her, the duo captures the pilot, and Shinn is shocked to see Stella inside the Gaia's cockpit.
26	"The Promise"; Transliteration: "Yakusoku" (Japanese: 約束)	Taiki Nishimura	Yūichi Nomura	April 16, 2005	September 21, 2007
Shinn carries the unconscious Stella to the Minerva's infirmary on his own authority before Talia reprimands him for violating military regulations. The doctor examining Stella calls Talia to explain that she is one of the Earth Alliance's "Extended" Naturals; because of her abnormally high count of bodily substances, he is unsure how effective their medicine will be. Hearing that her memories of him have been manipulated greatly upsets Shinn. At the same time, Athrun thinks about his recent meeting with Kira and Cagalli and feels depressed. Elsewhere, Neo is instructed to write Stella off as a loss and reluctantly orders to remove all memories of Stella from Sting and Auel's brains. Shinn visits Stella in the infirmary, holding the small shell she gave him, which makes her suddenly wake up and remember him. On the Archangel, Lacus decides to go to the PLANTs to investigate Athrun's claim, so she, along with Waltfeld, hijacks Meer's shuttle returning to PLANT, while a worried Kira covers their escape.
27	"Unfulfilled Feelings"; Transliteration: "Todokanu Omoi" (Japanese: 届かぬ想い)	Akihiko Nishiyama	Shigeru Morita; Chiaki Morosawa	April 23, 2005	September 28, 2007
Lacus and Waltfeld reunite with the FFMH-Y101 Eternal and her crew, disguised as an asteroid. Meanwhile, Durandal, upon learning of the hijacking, orders the tracking down of the real Lacus, insisting that she is the fake. Aboard the Minerva, Lunamaria hands in her report data to Talia, but she cannot bring herself to report that the Lacus Clyne they know is a fake and that someone tried to kill the real Lacus. Meanwhile, due to her status as an "Extended" Natural, Stella's condition deteriorates and cannot be treated normally. Neo is given strict orders from Lord Djibril to track and destroy the Minerva, bringing a united front from Orb as assistance. As originally planned, the Minerva departs for Gibraltar, where Neo plans to ambush them off the coast of Crete. Perceiving their movements, debates arise inside the Archangel, including from Miriallia, who had rejoined them. The Orb fleet will be destroyed if they do nothing, but they'll have to fight against Athrun if they choose to intervene. Cagalli frets over the situation, but, motivated by Kira's words, decides to head out to the battlefield. However, by the time the Archangel arrives, the Minerva has already started engaging the Orb forces.
28	"Survivors and Sacrifices"; Transliteration: "Nokoru Inochi Chiru Inochi" (Japanese: 残る命散る命)	Katsuyoshi Yatabe	Yūichi Nomura; Chiaki Morosawa	April 30, 2005	October 5, 2007
The Minerva is cornered into a geographically disadvantaged state, and Athrun and Shinn are unable to cover due to Abyss and Chaos' interference. Suddenly, Kira's Freedom and the Archangel appear, saving the Minerva from its predicament. Cagalli, aboard on Strike Rouge, once again tries to order the Orb forces to stand down, while Shinn is angered by the Archangel's repeated intervention and attacks the Strike Rouge. Kira moves in and attacks Shinn to defend Cagalli. Athrun tries to stop him, but Sting and Auel get in the way. Shinn goes into SEED Mode and strikes Abyss down, killing Auel, while Kira disables the Chaos' combat capability before clashing with Athrun's Saviour. Meanwhile, Yuna is reprimanded by Neo and orders Todaka and the others to pursue the Minerva. Talia orders the Minerva crew to consider the Archangel as hostile. Orb's mobile suits approach the ship, but Cagalli blocks the way. Cagalli can do nothing but watch helplessly as Orb's soldiers die one after another. Seeing this, Todaka orders the crew to abandon ship, then directs the Orb flagship Takemikazuchi to the front line. Kira, after defeating Athrun and tearing the Saviour to shreds, tries to save Takemikazuchi, but Shinn destroys it without hesitation with the Sword Impulse's "Excalibur" anti-ship laser swords, not knowing that his benefactor, Todaka, was on board.
29	"Fates" (Japanese: FATES)	Masahiro Takada	Chiaki Morosawa	May 7, 2005	October 12, 2007
Shortly after receiving the report of the real Lacus hijacking the fake Lacus' transport with Andrew Waltfeld, followed by Durandal's subsequent ordering of the tracking down of Lacus, he then recounts the past before and during the First Alliance-PLANT War in his office. A mirage of the late Rau Le Creuset appears before him. Durandal quietly asks the mirage Rau about the point of living if people are led by destiny, as Kira, Athrun, Lacus, and Cagalli did when they first met. At some point in the past, Talia Gladys and Durandal were in a relationship, but Talia left Durandal because she wanted to have children. The decision was inevitable, and they both mutually accepted it, but Durandal wonders whether what he really wanted lay along the path he did not choose. As he continues to ponder, Rau says that past decisions can't be changed, so everyone has no choice but to move forward into an unexpected future. Durandal vows that if there is no way to return to the past, he'll change everything. Note: This episode is largely composed of footage from Mobile Suit Gundam SEED.
30	"A Fleeting Dream"; Transliteration: "Setsuna no Yume" (Japanese: 刹那の夢)	Akira Toba	Natsuko Takahashi; Chiaki Morosawa	May 14, 2005	October 26, 2007
Back on Earth, the surviving Orb forces from the previous battle join the Archangel. After being welcomed by the crew, Orb lieutenant Amagi tells an emotional Cagalli Todaka's last words and explains that he and the others came to the Archangel to fight for Orb's ideals. Meanwhile, the Minerva stops for repairs and resupply despite being very close to Gibraltar. Being bested by Kira and his Saviour being damaged beyond repair had lowered Athrun's self-esteem, while Shinn is frustrated that he can't help Stella, whose condition continues to worsen. Later, Shinn overhears a conversation between Talia and the doctor, claiming that Stella will die regardless of what is done and experimented on. Realizing that if Stella is to live, Shinn must return her to the Earth Alliance. So, with Rey's help, they escape the Minerva with Stella and contact the Alliance using Gaia's IFF code, telling Neo to come and get her. On the coast at dawn, Shinn and Neo face each other, where the former asks Neo to promise to take Stella away from the war, and hands her over. Shinn gives Stella the bottle containing the shell she had given him and asks her not to forget him. He runs off, wiping off tears that have run down his cheek.
31	"The Endless Night"; Transliteration: "Akenai Yoru" (Japanese: 明けない夜)	Taiki Nishimura	Hiroshi Ōnogi; Chiaki Morosawa	May 21, 2005	November 2, 2007
After returning to the Minerva, Shinn and Rey are arrested for violating military regulations and confined to the brig. Despite knowing what would happen upon returning, Shinn does not believe he did anything wrong. Meanwhile, aboard Archangel, Cagalli and the former Orb soldiers renew their resolve, but Kira's worried thoughts keep drifting back to his conversation with Athrun until Murrue gently encourages him. Meanwhile, Neo is relieved from his duties to pursue the Minerva and heads to Russia under a new assignment. Neo gives the regenerated Stella a gigantic mobile suit, the GFAS-X1 Destroy Gundam. On the Minerva, a message is received from headquarters regarding Shinn and Rey's punishment, stating that they are not guilty of any wrongdoing. Talia, hoping to spare them from execution, becomes furious when she realizes that Durandal arranged the amnesty. Shinn is released, and his cockiness and rudeness, especially toward Athrun, escalate. Meanwhile, the Earth Alliance starts its invasion of Western Eurasia in Berlin, spearheaded by Stella in the Destroy. Receiving this report, both the Minerva and the Archangel take action.
32	"Stella"; Transliteration: "Sutera" (Japanese: ステラ)	Masahiro Takada	Hiroyuki Yoshino; Chiaki Morosawa	May 28, 2005	November 9, 2007
Stella in the Destroy continues her destructive rampage across Berlin. Kira in the Freedom, as well as the Archangel, arrive and block its way; however, Sting's Chaos and Neo's custom Windam join in assisting Destroy, adding to the overwhelming firepower of the Destroy. Even with Kira's skills, he is unable to even dent the giant Gundam. Cagalli sorties, along with Orb's Murasame squad, to help Kira. Suddenly, Shinn in the Force Impulse, as well as the Minerva, arrives to assist the local ZAFT forces in Berlin. Shinn attacks fiercely against Destroy, but Neo knocks him aside and tells him that the Destroy's pilot is Stella, stunning Shinn to the point of freezing in the middle of the fight. Kira continues to attack mercilessly against Destroy, even shooting down Neo's Windam. Stella is shocked to see Neo fall, and goes berserk. Shinn keeps Kira away from Stella and desperately calls out to her, causing her to come to and briefly pause. She is comforted by Shinn's words; however, she sees the Freedom through the cockpit crack and panics again. Stella charges Destroy's chest-mounted multi-phase energy cannons to fire at Shinn's Force Impulse before Kira stabs the Destroy's chest with the Freedom's beam sabers, and Destroy finally falls. Shinn rushes to the dying Stella and lifts her in his arms. Stella tells him she loves him, smiles, and takes her last breath, devastating Shinn.
33	"The World Revealed"; Transliteration: "Shimesareru Sekai" (Japanese: 示される世界)	Akihiko Nishiyama	Shigeru Morita; Chiaki Morosawa	June 4, 2005	November 23, 2007
Shinn lays Stella down a lake nearby, while still anguished and crushed over not being able to keep his promise to protect her, and a dark determination materializes in his eyes. While the Minerva is undergoing repairs in Berlin, Athrun, concerned about Shinn's mental state, visits Shinn's quarters and is shocked to see him creating a battle simulation for fighting against the legendary Freedom. Shinn and Rey say that as long as there is a chance to fight the most powerful mobile suit in the world, it is best to be prepared should they fight again, which utterly irritates Athrun, knowing their claim is correct. On the Archangel, the recovered Neo regains consciousness. From the body data left on the ship, it is confirmed that Neo is, in fact, Mu La Flaga, Captain Ramius' thought-to-be-dead boyfriend. However, he had lost his memories as Mu. Meanwhile, on PLANT, Durandal suddenly begins a worldwide broadcast across all forms of media, showing footage of the mass destruction of Berlin caused by the Destroy Gundam alongside other atrocities attributed to the Alliance. Then, photos and names of Logos members, whom Durandal had just declared war on, are displayed. People across Earth take up arms against the Earth Alliance, chanting Durandal's name.
34	"Nightmare"; Transliteration: "Akumu" (Japanese: 悪夢)	Akira Yoshimura	Yūichi Nomura; Chiaki Morosawa	June 11, 2005	November 30, 2007
As a result of Durandal's worldwide speech, the world turns against Logos, Blue Cosmos, and the Earth Alliance, and the PLANT Supreme Council unanimously supports Durandal's new policy. Meanwhile, Murrue and the others launch the Archangel toward Orb, agreeing to Cagalli and Kira's concern about their home country. On the Minerva, Talia receives new orders to assist ZAFT forces in intercepting the Archangel and shooting it down. Shinn rejoices at having the chance to fight the Freedom so soon, wanting revenge for Stella. However, Athrun cannot comply with this sudden order and argues with Talia, who had already filed a complaint with ZAFT headquarters, only to have it rejected, since PLANT's official decision regarding the Archangel is that it's a menace with an unknown purpose and must be sunk. As the ZAFT forces continue their onslaught on the Archangel, Talia, acting arbitrarily, offers them the option to surrender. Still, Murrue cannot accept because she has vowed to protect Cagalli. In the meantime, Shinn overwhelms Kira, making creative use of Impulse Gundam's unique characteristics and concentrates on fighting, as opposed to Kira, who's driven to protect the Archangel and never targets the enemy cockpits, gradually forcing Kira into a corner. As the Archangel reaches the sea and begins to submerge, Talia orders the Minerva to fire the "Tannhäuser". At the same time, Shinn's Excalibur anti-ship laser sword stabs through the Freedom's torso, before both Gundams are caught in the explosion caused by the Tannhäuser. However, only a damaged Impulse emerges out of the smoke, horrifying Athrun.
35	"Eve of Chaos"; Transliteration: "Konton no Saki ni" (Japanese: 混沌の先に)	Akira Toba	Natsuko Takahashi; Chiaki Morosawa	June 18, 2005	December 7, 2007
Unbeknownst to Shinn, Kira survived the ordeal since the cockpit was unscathed during the Impulse's final attack. Additionally, the heavily damaged Archangel escapes from the Minerva by submerging and detaching its damaged engines to fake its destruction. Back at the Minerva, the soldiers are rejoicing. When Shinn tells an angered Athrun that he took revenge for his and Athrun's behalf, Athrun grabs Shinn by the shirt and tells him that Kira was not even trying to shoot Shinn down, but rather protecting the Archangel. Shinn replies by saying that he deserved to feel happy after defeating a powerful enemy, then asks Athrun whether he thought Shinn should be crying, praying, or even killed during the battle, prompting Athrun to punch Shinn. Rey then tells Athrun that, despite Shinn's unacceptable attitude, he had succeeded in following ZAFT's orders to take down the Archangel and the Freedom, and that he should be congratulated rather than criticized. Athrun replied by saying it was no justification for Kira to die, and the Freedom and the Archangel were not their enemies, despite ZAFT's orders. Meanwhile, as Durandal's words inspire widespread uprisings against Logos, a bedridden Kira wakes up back on the Archangel, which is continuing on its way to Orb, with Mu concerned about what they plan to do with him. At the same time, Durandal and Meer make their way down to Earth to visit Shinn and Athrun, as the Minerva has now officially docked at Gibraltar. There, he introduces them to the new ZGMF-X42S Destiny Gundam and ZGMF-X666S Legend Gundam, which are intended as replacements for the Impulse and the Saviour, respectively.
36	"Athrun on the Run"; Transliteration: "Asuran Dassō" (Japanese: アスラン脱走)	Taiki Nishimura	Hiroshi Ōnogi; Chiaki Morosawa	June 25, 2005	December 14, 2007
Athrun lashes out at Durandal and asks why he issued the order to destroy the Archangel and the Freedom, since he and Kira were comrades despite him and the Archangel's crew confusing the war situation, but in the sense that they also wanted to eliminate war. At the Gibraltar base, preparation for the attack against the Earth Alliance's Heaven's Base is almost ready, while ZAFT welcomes an Earth Alliance fleet that has agreed to Durandal's plan; both of these events put the base on considerable edge. Later, Meer, worried about Athrun, visits him and tries to persuade him to obey Durandal after eavesdropping on a conversation between Durandal and Rey, knowing that anyone who does not play their assigned role dies without mercy. With Durandal's true colors revealed and Athrun's faith in him completely shattered, Athrun is branded a traitor and pursued by soldiers. He tries to take Meer with him, knowing what fate befalls her once she's no longer useful, but she refuses. Thanks to the quick thinking of Meyrin Hawke — Lunamaria's younger sister, who works on the Minerva's bridge crew — Athrun shakes off the base security and arrives at a mobile suit hangar. However, Rey soon catches them and tries to kill both Athrun and Meyrin, who board a GOUF Ignited together, and escape from Gibraltar to find the Archangel. Rey suits the Legend up, and together with Shinn in the Destiny, who was surprised by Athrun's betrayal, pursues them.
37	"Thunder in the Dark"; Transliteration: "Raimei no Yami" (Japanese: 雷鳴の闇)	Eiichi Kuboyama	Hiroshi Ōnogi; Hiroyuki Yoshino; Chiaki Morosawa	July 2, 2005	December 21, 2007
Shinn and Rey pursue Athrun and Meyrin's GOUF Ignited, with Durandal permitting them to shoot them down for security reasons after hearing that Meyrin is an intelligence expert. Talia protests, but Durandal turns a deaf ear. Meanwhile, Shinn is puzzled by the sudden order, but Rey persuades him, and they both fight and corner the GOUF Ignited. Athrun desperately tries to convince Shinn that they are not who Durandal thinks they are, but Rey alters his words. Shinn, as if to shake off the doubts in his mind, now firmly believes the two are traitors and impales the GOUF Ignited with the Destiny's "Arondight" beam sword. The crew of the Minerva hears of Athrun and Meyrin's betrayal and demise at the same time, but Talia and Lunamaria do not believe this, and the event shakes them to the core. Later back at the base, a remorseful Shinn hugs the upset Lunamaria following Meyrin's supposed death, expressing his regret that it has come to this. Meanwhile, Durandal issues an ultimatum to Heaven's Base, demanding that they hand over Djibril and all other Logos members, surrender, and disarm, or face a military response. Both the Archangel and the Eternal hear this transmission, and the atmosphere becomes tense. Kira and Lacus warn the others that Durandal's declaration signals an impending danger: if the Heaven's Base attack succeeds, Orb would be next.
38	"A New Flag"; Transliteration: "Atarashiki Hata" (Japanese: 新しき旗)	Masahiro Takada	Hiroyuki Yoshino; Chiaki Morosawa	July 9, 2005	December 28, 2007
As ZAFT moves in on Heaven's Base, a still-suffering Lunamaria turns her sorrow into determination for the upcoming battle and immerses herself in adjusting as the new pilot of the Impulse, while Athrun and Meyrin's deaths weigh heavily on Shinn's conscience. Still, Luna chooses to blame Logos for their deaths rather than Shinn, and they comfort each other by sharing their first kiss, thus becoming a couple. Confronted with the ultimatum from Durandal, Heaven's Base instead launches a pre-emptive attack on ZAFT, spearheaded by five newly-prepared Destroy Gundams, of which Sting is piloting one. Aboard the Archangel, a rescued Athrun regains consciousness. Athrun is happy to see Kira, whom he had thought dead following Shinn's attack. With Athrun too weak to move properly, he goes back to sleep with Cagalli watching over him. Back at the battle, while the Earth Alliance has the initial advantage over ZAFT, it flips completely as Shinn's Destiny, Rey's Legend, and Lunamaria's Sword Impulse annihilate the looming Destroy Gundams one after another. After the remaining Destroy, piloted by Sting, explodes, resulting in his death, a white flag is finally raised in Heaven's Base, signalling their surrender. Lord Djibril, however, had already escaped beforehand. Meanwhile, Kira witnesses the fall of Heaven's Base and grits his teeth, frustrated at his powerlessness, and knowing Orb is next on ZAFT's agenda.
39	"Kira of the Skies"; Transliteration: "Tenkū no Kira" (Japanese: 天空のキラ)	Akihiko Nishiyama	Shigeru Morita; Chiaki Morosawa	July 16, 2005	January 4, 2008
ZAFT gains complete control of Heaven's Base, but Lord Djibril's whereabouts are still unknown, and Durandal orders the army to track him down. Meanwhile, the damaged Archangel docks at Orb's Onogoro Island. While the crews are busy with the repairs, Kira feels powerless without the Freedom. Murrue tells him to hang on and gently encourages him, while Cagalli visits Athrun, and they exchange words for the first time in a while. Meanwhile, under Lacus' orders, Eternal crew member, Martin DaCosta, investigates the abandoned Mendel colony where there used to be the generic research laboratory. While all the data at the colony has been destroyed, DaCosta finds a scientific journal that mentions a "Destiny Plan" written by one of Durandal's researchers. Suddenly, the alarm on the Eternal sounds, as a ZGMF-LRR704B GINN Long Range Reconnaissance Type find the ship. Lacus decides to force the Eternal's way through so she can deliver "a certain thing" and the journal to Kira and the Archangel back on Earth. Hearing that the Eternal is in trouble, and with Athrun's insistence, Kira hastily borrows Cagalli's Strike Rouge and attaches a booster to it and heads into space. The Eternal is saved at the last moment, Kira and Lacus reunite, and the latter presents Kira with the brand new ZGMF-X20A Strike Freedom Gundam, which decimates the chasing ZAFT forces.
40	"Legacy of Gold"; Transliteration: "Ōgon no Ishi" (Japanese: 黄金の意志)	Shintarō Itoga	Yūichi Nomura; Chiaki Morosawa	July 23, 2005	January 11, 2008
Shinn, skillfully coaxed by Rey, continues holding the blind belief in Durandal's vision of the future, despite suffering nightmares of killing Athrun and Meyrin. Durandal hands out medals of honor bearing the FAITH insignia to Shinn and Rey before Djibril's whereabouts are finally confirmed to ZAFT and the Archangel crew: the Seiran family estate in Orb. ZAFT demands that the Seirans hand over Djibril, but Yuna announces that Djibril is not in Orb. ZAFT knows it's a lie and commences a military ascendency against the Orb Union. Although the Archangel is still under repairs, Kira being absent, and Athrun not fully recovered, Cagalli — worried about Orb — is nonetheless undeterred from trying to save her homeland, and is prepared to die to defend it. She begins to leave with the Murasame squad in an FX-550 Skygrasper when Kisaka and Erica Simmons appear, who bestow her the golden ORB-01 Akatsuki Gundam that her late father, Uzumi Nara Athha, left for her as a last resort in case Orb is ever in trouble again. Cagalli takes her father's will to heart and, with the Murasame units backing her, she seizes Orb's National Defense Headquarters, orders Yuna arrested and restrained on treason charges, and takes command of the Orb forces, managing to push back ZAFT. However, with the arrival of Shinn's Destiny and the Minerva, the tables turn once again. Cagalli's Oowashi Akatsuki and Shinn's Destiny clash with each other.
41	"Refrain"; Transliteration: "Rifurein" (Japanese: リフレイン)	N/A	N/A	July 30, 2005	January 18, 2008
Athrun and Kira recall the past events from their perspective and explain why they follow the paths they have chosen. Note: Omitted in the HD Remaster, making "Freedom and Justice" the new episode 41.
42	"Freedom and Justice"; Transliteration: "Jiyū to Seigi to" (Japanese: 自由と正義と)	Akira Toba	Hiroshi Ōnogi; Chiaki Morosawa	August 6, 2005	January 25, 2008
With Orb in crisis, and the Archangel scrambling, Murrue releases Mu and gives him the Skygrasper. Athrun, not fully recovered, is on the bridge and tries to convince Meyrin to disembark the ship before the Archangel leaves for Orb, not feeling comfortable with her fighting ZAFT, but she chooses to stay with Athrun. Meanwhile, off the coast of Onogoro Island, Cagalli and the Murasame units fight bravely in an effort to stop the Destiny, but Shinn's frenzied attack approaches the cockpit of Akatsuki Gundam. Just then, Kira in the Strike Freedom descends from space with Lacus in the Strike Freedom's sister unit and saves Cagalli in the nick of time. At the same time, as the Archangel and Minerva clash, three ZGMF-XX09T DOM Troopers piloted by Lacus loyalists, Hilda Harken, Mars Simeon, and Herbert Von Reinhard, arrive and help push the ZAFT forces back. Seeing that the odds are against them, Rey orders Shinn to retreat. Meanwhile, Cagalli reaches the National Defense Headquarters and reorganizes Orb's forces; however, Djibril's whereabouts remain unknown. Mu's Skygrasper joins the fight, siding with the Archangel, while the Destiny completes its resupply and sortie again, now alongside the Legend. Back on the Archangel, Athrun is in emotional turmoil, looking at the ZGMF-X19A ∞ Justice Gundam that Lacus had prepared for him. Lacus tells him that Kira wanted to give him the new Justice because the worst thing of all is not being able to do anything when you want to do something. Taking Kira's words to heart, Athrun chooses to fight of his own free will.
43	"A Call for Counterattack"; Transliteration: "Hangeki no Koe" (Japanese: 反撃の声)	Taiki Nishimura	Hiroshi Ōnogi; Natsuko Takahashi; Chiaki Morosawa	August 13, 2005	February 1, 2008
The Destiny and the Legend coordinate their attacks to fight Kira in the Strike Freedom, and he faces a hard battle. Despite Murrue's concerns, given his condition, Athrun takes off on the ∞ Justice with Lacus' persuasion. As Shinn and Rey overwhelm and prepares to fire at Kira, Athrun arrives and intervenes, trying to persuade Shinn to stop, telling him that he, of all people, must not attack Orb. Shocked to see Athrun alive, and still under Rey's influence in believing Athrun to be a traitor, a confused Shinn attacks the ∞ Justice. Athrun's determination outweighs his injury, and he stops the Destiny. Just then, Djibril launches in the Seirans' shuttle and successfully escapes to the Moon, despite efforts from both Lunamaria in the Force Impulse and Orb's Murasames to stop it. With the fall of the ZAFT's flagship St. Helens, and their failure in destroying the Archangel, Talia assumes command of the entire ZAFT fleet, ordering an immediate withdrawal. Athrun, exhausted and injured, falls unconscious, but is rescued by Kira. That evening, Mu confides to Murrue about his identity, claiming that he returned because he knew her from within. He requests to stay aboard the Archangel, which Murrue accepts, and they embrace. The following morning, Cagalli officially returns as Orb's representative, and she begins messaging Durandal through media outlets worldwide about the war with Logos. However, Meer interrupts the broadcast with her own statement. Durandal secretly smiles as he watches the broadcast, but his expression changes completely as the scene shifts; the real Lacus appearing beside Cagalli, and the world is rocked by her words about not being deceived by Meer, leaving Durandal stupefied at her presence in Orb.
44	"Lacus Times Two"; Transliteration: "Futari no Rakusu" (Japanese: 二人のラクス)	Eiichi Kuboyama	Hiroyuki Yoshino; Chiaki Morosawa	August 20, 2005	February 8, 2008
The real Lacus states on television that there is someone who has the same face, voice, and name as herself in the PLANTs, declares that she doesn't support Durandal's words or actions, and implores both Naturals and Coordinators to discover Durandal's true objectives. Meer becomes very worried upon seeing the real Lacus, but Durandal advises her to keep a low profile and sends her away. The broadcast also creates a stir within the Minerva. Rey, still blindly loyal to Durandal, tells Shinn and Lunamaria that just because she is real does not make her right, before changing the subject to the Strike Freedom and Athrun. Upon hearing that Athrun is still alive and on board the Archangel, Lunamaria learns that Meyrin might still be alive and on board the ship as well, upsetting her. Meanwhile, the Minerva receives new orders from the fleet headquarters to launch into space and head to the Moon to reunite with ZAFT's lunar fleet. At the Earth Alliance's Daedalus Lunar Base, Lord Djibril activates his ultimate trump card to turn the tables against PLANT: he plans to destroy PLANT's capital cluster, Aprilius One, with the Orbital All-Aspect Tactical Cannon, Requiem, from the far side of the Moon, using abandoned colony clusters to deflect the beam to hit Aprilius. The Joule Team, led by Yzak, notices the Alliance's movements and engages them in battle. While Requiem's beam barely misses the capital thanks to the Joule Team's intervention, six PLANT colonies surrounding Aprilius One are destroyed. Durandal orders the entire ZAFT military to conduct an emergency operation on the lunar base at around the same time that Cagalli rejoins the Archangel. Learning of Djibril's attack, as well as the true nature behind Durandal's Destiny Plan, the Archangel prepares to launch into space to stop both Durandal and Djibril, and create their own destiny.
45	"Prelude to Revolution"; Transliteration: "Henkaku no Jokyoku" (Japanese: 変革の序曲)	Akira Yoshimura	Shigeru Morita; Chiaki Morosawa	August 27, 2005	February 15, 2008
As Aprilius One is in a state of panic and being evacuated, ZAFT's main force desperately attacks the first Requiem relay station, Fauré. Meanwhile, the Minerva, heading to the Daedalus Lunar Base, is ordered to directly attack the base and destroy the Requiem cannon alone, since they do not know how long it will take for Requiem to recharge for its second shot onto Aprilius One. Lunamaria and Shinn share a tender moment before they and Rey both sortie from the Minerva in their Gundams and engage the Earth Alliance forces. The Minerva hits the Daedalus base with the Tannhäuser before Lunamaria in the Blast Impulse, seizing the opportunity, blasts into Requiem's control center with the task of destroying it. In the meantime, Djibril realizes that the odds are against him yet again and tries to fire the Requiem prematurely, while also intending to escape on the stealth ship Girty Lue simultaneously. However, the firing is stopped thanks to Lunamaria's intervention, while Shinn destroys the Daedalus headquarters. The Girty Lue is destroyed by Rey and the Legend waiting, killing Djibril, and the Logos leadership is finally eradicated. PLANT's citizens, who have been watching a live feed of the battle, scream in joy. Meanwhile, the Archangel has formally become part of the Orb's Second Space Fleet and, after parting with Cagalli, launches into space, bound for the lunar city Copernicus, to win true peace, based on freedom and independence.
46	"The Song of Truth"; Transliteration: "Shinjitsu no Uta" (Japanese: 真実の歌)	Masahiro Takada	Yūichi Nomura; Chiaki Morosawa	September 3, 2005	February 22, 2008
Requiem's relay stations have all been seized by ZAFT, but Durandal puts on hold what to do with them, and gives the Minerva and the lunar fleet some time off for their hard work in destroying Logos. Meanwhile, Meer, who is hiding in Copernicus, learns that the Archangel has docked at the city, and becomes nervous. If she acknowledges that Lacus exists, it means denying her own existence, which will get her killed. Meer's new attendant, Sarah, schemes to lure Meer into assassinating the real Lacus so she can assume Lacus' role. At Copernicus City, while Mu and Murrue spend time together, Kira, Lacus, Athrun, and Meyrin are out gathering intelligence under the guise of a shopping trip. After receiving an SOS from Meer and while realizing that it's a trap, the group goes to the designated location anyway. Lacus and Meer face each other for the first time, and while Meer is happy to see Athrun alive, she is terrified of Lacus, who tries to help her. Lacus gently admonishes Meer's proclamation of being Lacus by saying that nobody is able to be other than themselves. Then, Sarah fires at Lacus, but Athrun saves her just in time, before a firefight between the group and several gunmen begins. Sarah is wounded by a primed grenade shot back at her by Kira. Receiving an emergency message, Neo arrives in the Oowashi Akatsuki. As Lacus is about to climb into Akatsuki's hand, the dying Sarah tries to fire again, but Meer falls to the ground, having taken the bullet for Lacus. Athrun kills Sarah, as Meer tells Lacus about her true self, and says she is sorry before dying, gutting the group.
47	"Meer"; Transliteration: "Mīa" (Japanese: ミーア)	Akihiko Nishiyama	Chiaki Morosawa	September 10, 2005	February 29, 2008
Athrun and the others carry Meer's body to the Archangel for a funeral service, while regretting that they let her die in front of their eyes. Lacus looks through Meer's purse and finds her diary kept on a disk. She describes herself as an avid fan of Lacus Clyne and an aspiring singer, and explains that her days were fulfilled after undergoing plastic surgery to become Lacus at Durandal's discretion, following the "Break the World" Incident and the beginning of the Second Alliance-PLANT War. She also describes how nervous she was to impersonate Lacus, the longing and excitement of meeting Athrun for the first time, the sense of fulfillment and togetherness of a live performance, and the bliss of being supported by PLANT's masses and leading the people to peace. While reading Meer's words, Athrun departs from the room and laments how he never should've gone along with Durandal's plan to use Meer, although Kira says he had no reason but to go along with it, knowing the pull Durandal's words have on people. Meanwhile, Lacus remembers Meer's dying words: even if she was a fake, she "sang for peace," just as Lacus did. Kira comforts Lacus as she cries in Kira's arms while vowing never to forget Meer. In the meantime, Durandal issues a memorial statement regarding Meer's death to the world on PLANT's behalf, then introduces his Destiny Plan, labeling it "The last defense for the survival of the human race."
48	"To a New World"; Transliteration: "Shinsekai e" (Japanese: 新世界へ)	Taiki Nishimura	Hiroyuki Yoshino; Chiaki Morosawa	September 17, 2005	March 7, 2008
The Destiny Plan, as described from a prior conversation between the Archangel crew, is to conduct a thorough analysis of the genetic makeup of all people and place them in occupations consistent with their vocational aptitude from birth. By doing so, it creates a world where everyone lives happily with wars and conflicts obsolete and pointless. However, such a society is strictly controlled, and free will is not recognized. Durandal declares the immediate execution of his plan to both Earth and the PLANTs. The Orb Union and the Kingdom of Scandinavia immediately reject the plan, while the rest of the world struggles to respond to this surprising proposition; even the crew of the Minerva is confused. Rey insists that Shinn, who is skeptical of the Destiny Plan, is the only person capable of protecting the world in a war-free society. Rey then has a panic attack and takes some pills, which worries Shinn, but he has his determination to fight for Durandal and the world renewed. Meanwhile, Durandal learns that an Alliance fleet of the Arzachel Lunar Base is about to rebel, so he blasts the base with Requiem, which he had secretly repaired, killing Joseph Copeland, the president of the Atlantic Federation, and most of the Earth Alliance's remaining forces. The crew of the Archangel and the others, horrified by this action, launch to rendezvous with the Eternal to stop Durandal's madness. In the meantime, Durandal sends orders for Shinn and Rey to come to the Messiah space fortress with their Gundams.
49	"Rey"; Transliteration: "Rei" (Japanese: レイ)	Akira Toba	Hiroyuki Yoshino; Chiaki Morosawa	September 24, 2005	March 21, 2008
The Archangel rendezvous with the Eternal and sorties to destroy the Requiem's primary relay station, Station One. The majority of ZAFT's lunar fleet moves to intercept them, but Lacus announces that Requiem is a genocidal weapon unnecessary to the human world and confidently declares that she will destroy it. Meanwhile, Shinn and Rey head to the Messiah in the Destiny and the Legend, where Durandal accuses Lacus of being "an act to close the path to peace." While Shinn feels uncomfortable, he shakes off his doubts and renews his determination to fight the enemies to break the chain of hatred. The Minerva promptly arrives at the battlefield and clashes with the Archangel. The Minerva fires the Tannhäuser at the Archangel, which is unable to evade without exposing the Eternal to the blast. Mu blocks the shot with the Shiranui Akatsuki, which causes him to recall how he did the same thing during the Second Battle of Jachin Due of the previous war, and he regains his memories as Mu La Flaga, which causes Murrue to tear up happily when he confirms it to her. He then destroys the Tannhäuser with the Akatsuki's beam rifle. Lunamaria sorties in the Impulse to take out the Eternal. Before doing so, however, Meyrin calls out to her to stop, shocking Lunamaria that Meyrin is still alive and on board the Eternal. Meanwhile, Kira and Athrun, with the help of Yzak and Dearka, succeed in finally destroying Station One using their Gundams docked in the new METEOR units. They are about to move to join Orb's main fleet in attacking the Daedalus base when suddenly, the Messiah appears over the horizon and fires Neo-GENESIS, a smaller-yet-improved version of the original GENESIS, which annihilates the attacking fleet with a single blow. Shinn and Rey launch in the Destiny and the Legend, approaching from the front, while the Minerva approaches from the rear. With all possible exits blocked by enemies, the Archangel and the Eternal are forced to fight.
50	"The Final Power"; Transliteration: "Saigo no Chikara" (Japanese: 最後の力)	Mitsuo Fukuda; Masahiro Takada	Chiaki Morosawa	October 1, 2005	March 28, 2008
Kira in the Strike Freedom is confronted by Rey — who reveals himself as Rau Le Creuset's genetic twin — in the Legend, as Athrun in the ∞ Justice battles the combined forces of Lunamaria in the Force Impulse and Shinn in the Destiny. Meanwhile, Durandal orders the rest of ZAFT's forces not to engage the remainder of Orb's main fleet but to focus their attacks on the Eternal, on which is Lacus. Kira joins up with the Eternal to deal with Messiah and Neo-GENESIS, and orders Athrun to link up with the Archangel and head for Requiem to assist the Orb forces in destroying it, since Orb is Requiem's next target. Yzak, Dearka, and the rest of the Joule Team also throw their support behind the Eternal, as well as the DOM Trooper trio. Shinn and Lunamaria, meanwhile, support the Minerva, which is pursuing the Archangel. After Kira defeats Rey and incapacitates the Legend, Athrun fights Lunamaria and Shinn, and discovers the latter's reason for gaining power and supporting the Destiny Plan: to destroy Orb so the world can be changed for the greater good, and no one could suffer what he had suffered through conflict. Athrun replies that the Destiny Plan would kill off their future, and defeats Shinn in battle, causing the crippled Destiny to crash onto the Moon, with Lunamaria following. Note: In the HD Remaster, this is episode 49, and the new episode 50, using footage from the Special Episode "Final Plus", is called "The Chosen Future."

=== Mobile Suit Gundam SEED Destiny: Special Episodes ===
The opening theme for Final Plus was "Vestige" (vestige -ヴェスティージ-, Vesutīji) by T.M.Revolution.

Phase no.	Title	Original release date
Special Plus (15.5)	"Destiny" (Japanese: DESTINY)	January 29, 2005
Retitled Phase 15.5. A recap of the first fifteen episodes of Gundam SEED Destiny.
Final Plus (51)	"The Chosen Future"; Transliteration: "Erabareta Mirai" (Japanese: 選ばれた未来)	December 25, 2005
After defeating Shinn, Athrun heads back to the Archangel to support it against the Minerva. The combined efforts of Athrun and the Archangel severely damage the ship, causing it to crash onto the Moon. Neo-GENESIS' second shot also destroys several allied ZAFT ships, shocking the Minerva crew, as well as Yzak and Dearka. As Requiem prepares to fire its second shot at Orb, it is soon destroyed in the joint effort of the ∞ Justice's Fatum-01 backpack and the Shiranui Akatsuki's Guided Mobile Beam Turrets. Kira docks the Strike Freedom again with METEOR 07, disables Messiah's shield with the METEOR's beam swords and inflicts massive damage to it with Eternal's help. Kira then enters the collapsing fortress to confront Durandal. Holding each other at gunpoint, Durandal warns Kira that a world, if given the freedom of choice, would always find a way to return to conflict and that by killing him, he would only plunge humanity into chaos once more. However, Kira replies that even if mankind creates wars, they could still improve, and that no one should be subjected to a future that will never change. During this, Rey, Athrun, and Talia make their way onto the Messiah. Durandal is then shot by Rey, motivated by Kira's words. Talia orders Kira and Athrun to leave the Messiah as she, Rey, and Durandal are killed when the doomed space fortress crashes to the Moon's surface. The Eternal opens peace talks with the remaining ZAFT forces at Lacus' discretion, and all surviving ships fire signal flares to call for a ceasefire. Mu and Murrue continue their romantic relationship, Shinn and Lunamaria are rescued off the Moon by Athrun, Orb and PLANT make peace, Lacus becomes PLANT Supreme Council's Chairwoman, and the Second Alliance-PLANT War ends. Later, on Orb, as Shinn pays tribute to his family with Lunamaria, Meyrin, and Athrun, Kira and Lacus arrive to pay their own tribute. Athrun introduces Kira to Shinn as the pilot of the Freedom, catching Shinn by surprise, and Kira and Shinn agree to make peace now that all hostilities are over. Kira also joins ZAFT alongside Athrun, Lunamaria, Meyrin, and Shinn, serving as a commander, much to Lacus' joy.

=== Mobile Suit Gundam SEED Destiny: Special Edition - Tetralogy movies ===
Phase no.	Title	Original release date
Special–I	"The Shattered World"; Transliteration: "Kudakareta Sekai" (Japanese: 砕かれた世界)	May 2, 2006
Covers the events of Gundam SEED Destiny Phases 1 to 13.
Special–II	"Their Respective Swords"; Transliteration: "Sorezore no Tsurugi" (Japanese: それぞれの剣)	July 27, 2006
Covers the events of Gundam SEED Destiny Phases 14 to 28.
Special–III	"The Hellfire of Destiny"; Transliteration: "Sadame No Gōka" (Japanese: 運命の業火)	October 8, 2006
Covers the events of Gundam SEED Destiny Phases 29 to 42.
Special–IV	"The Cost of Freedom"; Transliteration: "Jiyū no Daishō" (Japanese: 自由の代償)	February 23, 2007
Covers the events of Gundam SEED Destiny Phases 43 to 50 and "Final Plus".
