= List of Latvian films of 2014 =

The Latvian film industry produced over ten feature films in 2014. This article fully lists all non-pornographic films, including short films, that had a release date in that year and which were at least partly made by Latvia. It does not include films first released in previous years that had release dates in 2014.
Also included is an overview of the major events in Latvian film, including film festivals and awards ceremonies, as well as lists of those films that have been particularly well received, both critically and financially.

== Major releases ==
Opening		Title	Cast and Crew	Studio	Genre(s)	Ref.
J U L Y	7	Rocks in My Pockets	Director: Signe Baumane; Cast: Signe Baumane	Zeitgeist Films	Animation	
A U G U S T	4	The Lesson	Director: Andris Gauja; Cast: Inga Alsiņa, Mārcis Klatenbergs, Andrejs Smoļakovs, Gatis Gāga, Liena Šmukste, Marina Janaus, Edgars Siliņš, Ieva Apine, Elza Feldmane, Agirs Neminskis	Riverbed	Drama	
S E P T E M B E R	9	Modris	Director: Juris Kursietis; Cast: Kristers Piksa		Drama	

== See also ==
- 2014 in film
- 2014 in Latvia
- Cinema of Latvia
- List of Latvian submissions for the Academy Award for Best Foreign Language Film
