= Mute Nights Festival =

Ukrainian cinema festival

Mute Nights
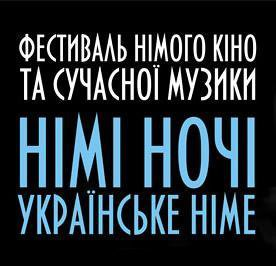
- Festival logo Ukrainian: Німі ночі)
- Location: Odesa, Ukraine
- Language: International; Silent films
- Website: http://mutenightsfestival.com

Mute Nights (Ukrainian: Німі ночі) or Festival of Silent Film and Contemporary Music, is an annual film festival which takes place in Odesa, Ukraine on the third weekend of June, organized by Ivan and Yuriy Lypa Charitable Foundation and State Film Agency of Ukraine. The festival's debut opening ceremonies were held at the Korobchinsky Art Center on June 18, 2010.

== Mission ==
The festival is intended to aid in the popularization and reinterpretation of international silent film classics by means of contemporary music interpretations, performed by European guest-artists and Ukrainian musicians, and to restore a contemporary art context to the Ukrainian avant-garde films of Alexander Dovzhenko, Dziga Vertov, Ivan Kavaleridze, Heorhiy Stabovyi and others.

== Festival ==
The festival is an open air and runs for a two-day period at the moorage of Odesa yacht-club. As the first Ukrainian films were created in Odesa, the city was chosen as the venue, where Festival takes place.

=== Silent Nights 2010 ===
The first silent film and modern music festival "Silent Nights" took place on June 18-20, 2010. The festival program consisted of twelve full-length and short silent films and two sound tapes from Ukrainian, Russian, German and French film archives. The opening film of the festival was the film collage "Symphony in Images" (Una Sinfinia en Imagenes) by the Spanish director Carlos Rodríguez, created as an illustration of Hector Berlioz's "Fantastic Symphony" and presented for the first time at the Sydney Opera House and at the IFF in San Sebastian.

The program of the festival included the films "Hush, be sad, be quiet" (1918), "Night coachman" (1929), "Arsenal" (1929), "Man with a film camera" (1929), "Earth in captivity" (1927), " A Strong Man" (1929), "Raskolnikov" (1919) and retrospectives of avant-garde directors of Ukrainian origin Eugene Deslav and Maya Deren. The closing film of the festival is Fyodor Otsep's 1931 sensational film with the participation of Anna Sten and Fritz Kortner "The Murderer Dmitri Karamazov" based on F. M. Dostoevsky's novel "The Brothers Karamazov". The titles of the sets were Ukrainian legendary actors Vira Kholodna and Semyon Svashenko and popular European stars from Ukraine Anna Sten and Hryhoriy Khmara.

The films were voiced by musicians from Ukraine, Russia, and Poland: Yuriy Kuznetsov, Vitaly Tkachuk Quartet, Too Sleepy, Diana Miro, ShockolaD, Arseniy Trofim. The total traffic of the festival was about 3,000 people.
