= Rasganço =

2001 film by Raquel Freire

- Directed by: Raquel Freire
- Release date: November 30, 2001
- Running time: 100 minutes
- Country: Portugal
- Language: Portuguese

Rasganço is a 2001 Portuguese drama film directed by Raquel Freire. It was released on 30 November.

== Cast ==
- Ana Teresa Carvalhosa
- Isabel Ruth
- Paula Marques
- Ricardo Aibéo
- Paulo Rocha
- Luís Miguel Cintra
- Ivo Ferreira
- Ana Brandão
- Ana Moreira
- Lúcia Sigalho

== Reception ==
On Público, Vasco Câmara gave it 3 out of 5 stars and Luís Miguel Oliveira gave it 2 out of 5.
