= List of Belarusian films =

This is a list of films produced in Belarus:

== 1920s ==
=== 1926 ===
- Tale of the Woods or True Forest Story

=== 1927 ===
- Prostitute

=== 1928 ===
- Kastus Kalinovsky
- His Excellency

=== 1929 ===
- See You Tomorrow

== 1930s ==
=== 1930 ===
- Hatred

=== 1933 ===
- The Return of Nathan Becker
- The First Platoon

=== 1934 ===
- Lieutenant Kijé

=== 1936 ===
- Late for a Date
- Seekers of Happiness

=== 1938 ===
- The Bear

== 1970s ==
=== 1975 ===
- The Adventures of Buratino

=== 1977 ===
- About Red Riding Hood

== 1980s ==
=== 1985 ===
- Come and See

== 1990s ==
=== 1990 ===
- Vanka-vstanka

=== 1991 ===
- Med osy

=== 1992 ===
- Beloe ozero
- Bez ulik
- Kooperativ Politbyuro ili budet dolgim proshchanie
- Na tebya upovayu
- Russkoye shchastye
- 'Vremya vashey zhizni

=== 1993 ===
- Az vozdam
- Chernyi aist
- Chertovy kukly
- Gladiator po naimu
- Istoki
- Keshka i biznes
- Keshka i gumanoid
- Khochu v Ameriku
- Me Ivan, You Abraham
- Opoznanie
- Roman imperatora

=== 1994 ===
- Roman 'alla russa'
- Shlyaktich zavalna
- Tsvety provintsyi
- Zakoldovannyie

=== 1995 ===
- Igra voobrazheniya
- Lato milosci
- Peyzazh s tremya kupalshchitsami
- Syn za ottsa...
- On Black Slash-and-Burn Fields

=== 1996 ===
- Beg ot smerti
- Drugoi
- From Hell to Hell
- Obyknovennyi prezident
- Vozvrashcheniye bronenostsa

=== 1997 ===
- Botanicheskiy sad
- Zeezicht

=== 1998 ===
- Strakh

=== 1999 ===
- Lyubit po-russki 3: Gubernator
- Reyndzher iz atomnoy zony

== 2000s ==
=== 2001 ===
- V avguste 44-go
- Povodyr

=== 2002 ===
- Desert Cemetery
- Kavkazkie plenniki
- Prikovannyy
- Reportazh iz kletky dlya krolikov

=== 2003 ===
- Anastasia Slutskaya
- Babiy Yar
- Chernobyl Heart
- Kola (short film)
- My zhivem na krai

=== 2004 ===
- On the Nameless Height
- Dunechka
- Mysterium Occupation
- Prodolzheniye

=== 2006 ===
- A Lesson of Belarusian (documentary film)
- Franz + Polina
- Posledniy bronepoezd

=== 2007 ===
- Shchit otechestva

=== 2009 ===
- Dneprovsiy rubezh

== 2010s ==
=== 2010 ===
- Fortress of War
- Massacre

=== 2011 ===
- Belarusian Dream

=== 2012 ===
- Viva Belarus!
- In the Fog

=== 2014 ===
- Crossroads
- The Interrogation of Muscular P.O.W.
- Kinder-Vileyskoe prividenie
- Lucky People
- Made in China
- S 8 marta, muzhchiny!
- Vanya i Totoshka
- Where is the Kinobalagan gone
- Ya ne vernus

=== 2017 ===
- Overwinter

Overwinter from 2007

== 2020s ==
=== 2020 ===
- Kupała
