= List of Ukrainian films of the 2000s =

- 2000 Нескорений / The Undefeated, directed by Oles Yanchuk
- 2000 Мийники автомобілів / Car Washers, directed by Volodymyr Tykhyi
- 2001 На Полі Крові / Akeldama, directed by Yaroslav Lupiy
- 2001 Молитва за гетьмана Мазепу / Prayer for Hetman Mazepa, directed by Yuriy Illienko
- 2002 Чорна Рада / Chorna Rada (Black Council), directed by Mykola Zasieiev-Rudenko
- 2002 Таємниця Чингісхана / Secret of Genghis Khan, directed by Volodymyr Seveliev
- 2003 Мамай / Mamay, directed by Oles Sanin
- 2003 Один у полі воїн / One Man Army, directed by Henadiy Virsta and Oleh Mosiychuk
- 2003 Цикута / Cikuta, directed by Oleksandr Shapiro
- 2003 Золота лихоманка / Gold Rush, directed by Mykhailo Bielikov
- 2003 Вишивальниця в сутінках / Embroiderers in the dark, directed by Mykola Sedniev
- 2004 Проти Сонця / Against the Sun, directed by Valentyn Vasianovych
- 2004 Михайлюки / Mykhailiuky, directed by Serhiy Krutyn
- 2004 Водій для Віри / A Driver for Vira, directed by Pavlo Chukhrai
- 2004 Залізна сотня / The Company of Heroes, directed by Oles Yanchuk
- 2004 Украдене щастя / Stolen Happiness, directed by Andriy Donchyk (by the drama of Ivan Franko)
- 2004 Між Гітлером і Сталіном — Україна в II Світовій війні / Between Hitler and Stalin, directed by Sviatoslav Novytsky (documentary film)
- 2004 Червоний ренесанс / Red Renaissance, directed by Viktor Shkurin and Oleksandr Frolov (documentary film)
- 2005 День Сьомий. Півтори Години У Стані Громадянської Війни / Day Seven, directed by Oles Sanin (documentary film)
- 2005 Дрібний Дощ / Drizzle, directed by Heorhiy Deliyev (short film)
- 2005 Далекий постріл / Far Shot, directed by Valeriy Shalyha
- 2005 Братство / Brotherhood, directed by Stanislav Klymenko
- 2005 Помаранчеве небо / The Orange Sky, directed by Oleksandr Kiriyenko
- 2005 У рамках долі — Історія 1-ї української дивізії УНА 1943—1945 / History of the First Ukrainian Division UNA 1943-1945, directed by Taras Khymych (documentary film)
- 2006 Прорвемось! / Stop Revolution!, directed by Ivan Kravchyshyn
- 2006 Собор на крові / Sobor on the Blood, directed by Ihor Kobryn (documentary film)
- 2006 Музей Степана Бандери У Лондоні / Stepan Bandera Museum In London, directed by Oles Yanchuk (documentary film)
- 2006 Аврора / Aurora, directed by Oksana Bairak
- 2006 Штольня / The Pit, directed by Liubomyr Levytskyi (Kobylchuk)
- 2006 Хеппі Піпл / Happy People, directed by Oleksandr Shapiro
- 2007 НАТО: свій чи чужий? / NATO: Friend or Foe?, directed by Vadym Kastelli (documentary film)
- 2007 Приблуда / The Stray, directed by Valeriy Yamburskyi (short film)
- 2007 Богдан-Зиновій Хмельницький / Bohdan-Zynoviy Khmelnytskyi, directed by Mykola Mashchenko
- 2008 Дума про Тараса Бульбу / Duma about Taras Bulba, directed by Petro Pinchuk and Yevhen Bereziak
- 2008 Прикольна казка / Funny Tale, directed by Roman Shyrman
- 2008 Сафо. Кохання без меж / Sappho. Love without Limits, directed by Robert Crombie
- 2008 Владика Андрей / Metropolitan Andrey, directed by Oles Yanchuk
- 2008 Ілюзія страху / Illusion of Fear, directed by Oleksandr Kiriyenko
- 2008 Меніни / Las Meninas, directed by Ihor Podolchak
- 2008 Тринадцять місяців / Thirteen Months, directed by Illia Noiabrov
- 2008 Обійми Мене / Embrace Me, directed by Liubomyr Levytskyi (Kobylchuk)
- 2008 Закон / The Law, directed by Vitaliy Potrukh (short film)
- 2009 Хай Бог розсудить їх... / Let God Judge Them, directed by Yevhen Khvorostianko (short film)
- 2009 День переможених / Day of the Defeated, directed by Valeriy Yamburskyi
