= Rui Simões =

Portuguese film director, producer and teacher

- Born: Rui Simões; 20 March 1944 (age 82); Lisbon, Portugal
- Occupations: Director, teacher
- Years active: 1975–present

Rui Simões (born Lisbon, 20 March 1944) is a Portuguese film director, who is known for his practice of historical documentary, seen as Cinema Militante, for political intervention, and also for directing video documentaries and recordings of theater and dance performances.

== Biography ==
After finishing his secondary education, and later attending a course in ballet at the Teatro Nacional de São Carlos in Lisbon, he left the country in 1966 to avoid military service and mobilization for the Portuguese Colonial War. He settled in Paris and later in Brussels, where he attended the École Ouvriére Supérieure and a course in History at the Université libre de Bruxelles. In 1970 he was a student in the Film and Television Directing course at the IAD (Institut des Arts de Diffusion in Brussels).

He returned to Portugal after the April 1974 Carnation Revolution. He worked for António da Cunha Telles's company Animatógrafo as a production manager. He taught training courses for several institutions, such as the Núcleo de Cineastas Independentes, higher schools of education, the Quaser-Centro, the Academia de Artes e Tecnologias, the NOVA University of Lisbon, and Independente University in Lisbon. He also lectured in the United States of America, at Harvard University's Carpenter Center, Cornell University's Department of History and Anthropology, and at the University of California, Berkeley's Pacific Films Archives.

== Realficção Production Company ==
Rui Simões is responsible for the production company Realficção (Lisboa), where he also develops audiovisual and multimedia teaching activities. The business dedicates itself not only to producing his own works, but also those of directories who are concerned with social injustices for disfavored or marginal groups, both in Portugal and in former Portuguese colonies.

== Filmography ==
=== Feature-Length Films ===
- 1976 – Deus, Pátria, Autoridade (God, Homeland, Authority)
- 1980 – Bom Povo Português (Good Portuguese People)
- 2006 – Ensaio sobre o Teatro (Essay on Theatre)
- 2009 – Ruas da Amargura (Streets of Bitterness)
- 2010 – Ilha da Cova da Moura (Cova da Moura Island)
- 2014 – Guerra ou Paz (War or Peace)

=== Short films ===
- 1976 – São Pedro da Cova (in three short films)

== Vídeos ==
- Video productions on the Realficção website

== See also ==
- Cinema Militante
- Portuguese film
