= List of Ukrainian films of the 1970s =

- 1970 Білий птах з чорною ознакою / White Bird with Black Mark, directed by Yuriy Illienko
- 1971 Захар Беркут / Zakhar Berkut, directed by Leonid Osyka (by the story of Ivan Franko)
- 1971 Червона рута / Chervona Ruta, directed by Roman Oleksiv (musical featuring Sofia Rotaru and Vasyl Zinkevych)
- 1972 Пропала Грамота / The Lost Letter, directed by Borys Ivchenko
- 1973 У бій ідуть лише «старі» / Only Old Men are Going to Battle, directed by Leonid Bykov
- 1974 Марина / Maryna, directed by Borys Ivchenko
- 1975 Пісня завжди з нами / Song is Always with Us, directed by Viktor Storozhenko (musical featuring Sofia Rotaru)
- 1976 Ати-бати, йшли солдати... / Aty-baty, Soldiers were Going..., directed by Leonid Bykov
- 1976 Тривожний місяць вересень / The Troubled Month of Veresen, directed by Leonid Osyka
- 1977 Весь світ в очах твоїх... / All the World is in Your Eyes, directed by Stanislav Klymenko
- 1978 Море / Sea, directed by Leonid Osyka
- 1979 Дударики / Dudaryky, directed by Stanislav Klymenko
- 1979 Вавілон XX / Babylon XX, directed by Ivan Mykolaichuk
