= List of Ukrainian films of the 2010s =

2012-2013 (PDF)

== 2010 ==
- Щастя моє / My Joy, directed by Serhiy Loznytsia
- Золотий вересень. Хроніка Галичини 1939-1941 / Golden September. The Halychyna Chronicles 1939-1941, directed by Taras Khymych (documentary film)

== 2011 ==
- Гамер / Gámer, directed by Oleh Sentsov
- Вона заплатила життям / She Paid the Ultimate Price, directed by Iryna Korpan (documentary film)
- Той, хто пройшов крізь вогонь / Firecrosser, directed by Mykhailo Illienko
- Легка, як пір'їнка / Feathered Dreams, directed by Andriy Rozhen

== 2012 ==
- Мамо, я льотчика люблю! / Mom, I Love a Pilot!, directed by Oleksandr Ihnatusha
- Не переймайся / Don't Worry!, directed by Hanka Tretiak
- Гайдамака / Haidamaka, directed by Roman Synchuk (short film)
- Срібна Земля. Хроніка Карпатської України 1919-1939 / Silver Land. The Chronicles of Carpatho-Ukraine 1919-1939, directed by Taras Khymych (documentary film)
- Хайтарма / Haytarma, directed by Akhtem Seitablaiev
- Звичайна справа / Business as Usual, directed by Valentyn Vasianovych

== 2013 ==
- Delirium, directed by Ihor Podolchak
- Присмерк / Twilight, directed by Valentyn Vasianovych (documentary film)
- Креденс / Credenza, directed by Valentyn Vasianovych
- Іван Сила / Strong Ivan, directed by Viktor Andiyenko
- Параджанов / Paradjanov, directed by Serge Avedikian and Olena Fetisova
- F 63.9 Хвороба кохання / F 63.9 Love Sickness, directed by Dmytro Tomashpilskyi and Olena Demianenko
- Ломбард / Pawnshop, directed by Liubomyr Levytskyi (Kobylchuk)
- Тіні Незабутих Предків / Unforgotten Shadows , directed by Liubomyr Levytskyi (Kobylchuk)
- Брати. Остання сповідь / Brothers. The final confession, directed by Viktoriya Trofimenko
- Зелена кофта / The Green Jacket, directed by Volodymyr Tykhyi

== 2014 ==
- Хроніка Української Повстанської Армії 1942-1954 / The Chronicles of Ukrainian Insurgent Army 1942-1954, directed by Taras Khymych (documentary film)
- Плем'я / The Tribe, directed by Myroslav Slaboshpytskyi
- Поводир / The Guide, directed by Oles Sanin
- Майдан / Maidan, directed by Serhiy Loznytsia (documentary film)
- Viy, directed by Oleg Stepchenko
- Lyubov v bolshom gorode 3, directed by Marius Balchunas
- Odinok po kontraktu, directed by Evgeniy Matvienko
- Once My Mother, directed by Sophia Turkiewicz
- Once Upon a Time in Ukraine, directed by Igor Parfenov
- Passenger from San Francisco, directed by Anatoly Balchev
- Polit zolotoyi mushky, directed by Ivan Kravchyshyn
- Spasenie, directed by Sasha Litvinenko
- Spleen, directed by Marc Rodríguez
- Stand, directed by Jonathan Taieb
- Toloka, directed by Mykhailo Illienko
- Trubach, directed by Anatoliy Mateshko
- Z Joke

== 2015 ==
- Легіон. Хроніка Української Галицької Армії 1918—1919 / Legion. The Chronicles of Ukrainian Halychyna Army 1918-1919, directed by Taras Khymych (documentary film)
- Зима у вогні: Боротьба України за свободу / Winter on Fire: Ukraine's Fight for Freedom, directed by Yevhen Afinieievskyi (documentary film)
- Незламна / Battle for Sevastopol, directed by Serhiy Mokrytskyi
- Загублене місто / Lost City, directed by Vitaliy Potrukh
- Гетьман / Hetman, directed by Valeriy Yamburskyi
- Люби мене / Love Me, directed by Maryna Er Horbach and Mehmed Bahadir Er
- Тепер я буду любити тебе / Now I'm Gonna Love You, directed by Roman Shyrman
- Ukrainian Sheriffs

== 2016 ==
- The Nest of the Turtledove
- Слуга народа 2 / Servant of the People 2, directed by Aleksey Kiryushchenko

== 2017 ==
- Інфоголік / Infoholic, directed by Valentyn Shpakov and Vladyslav Klymchuk
- Merry-Go-Round, directed by Ihor Podolchak
- Dustards / Dustards, directed by Stanislav Gurenko
- Black Level, directed by Valentyn Vasyanovych
- Брама / The Gateway, directed by Volodymyr Tykhyi
- Сторожова застава / The Stronghold, directed by Yuriy Kovalyov

== 2018 ==
- Скажене весілля / Crazy Wedding, directed by Vladyslav Klymchuk
- Не хвилюйся, двері відчиняться / Don't Worry, the Doors Will Open, directed by Oksana Karpovych
- Я. Ти. Він. Вона / Me. You. He. She, directed by Volodymyr Zelenskyi and David Dodson

== 2019 ==
- Скажене весілля 2 / Crazy Wedding 2, directed by Vladyslav Klymchuk
