= List of Ukrainian films of the 1940s =

These movies are a list of Ukrainian movies published from the 1940s:

- 1941 Богдан Хмельницький / Bohdan Khmelnytsky, (inspired by the tales of Bohdan Khmelnytsky) directed by Ihor Savchenko
- 1943 Битва за нашу Радянську Україну / Battle for Soviet Ukraine, directed by Oleksandr Dovzhenko
- 1947 Подвиг розвідника / Secret Agent, directed by Borys Barnet.
