= List of Ukrainian films of the 1960s =

- 1960 Наталія Ужвій / Nataliya Uzhviy, directed by Serhiy Paradzhanov
- 1961 За двома зайцями / Chasing Two Hares, directed by Viktor Ivanov (by the play of Mykhailo Starytsky)
- 1962 Квітка на камені (Ніхто так не кохав) / Flower on the Stone, directed by Serhiy Paradzhanov
- 1963 Королева бензоколонки / Queen of the Gas Station, directed by Mykola Litus and Oleksiy Mishurin
- 1964 Тіні забутих предків / Shadows of Forgotten Ancestors, directed by Serhiy Paradzhanov
- 1964 Сон / The Dream, directed by Volodymyr Denysenko
- 1965 Гадюка / The Viper, directed by Viktor Ivchenko
- 1965 Криниця для спраглих / Well for thirsty, directed by Yuriy Illienko
- 1966 Соловей із села Маршинці / Nightingale from the Village of Marshyntsi, directed by Rostyslav Synko (musical featuring Sofia Rotaru)
- 1967 Київські мелодії / Kyiv Melodies, directed by Ihor Samborskyi
- 1968 Анничка / Annychka, directed by Borys Ivchenko
- 1968 Камінний хрест / Stone cross, directed by Leonid Osyka (by the novels of Vasyl Stefanyk)
- 1969 Ми з України / We are from Ukraine, directed by Vasyl Illiashenko
