= List of Portuguese films of 2010 =

A list of Portuguese films that were first released in 2010.

Release date	Title	Director	Cast	Genre	Notes	Ref
January 7	A Rua	José Filipe Costa	Ana Brandão			
January 28	A Bela e o Paparazzo	António-Pedro Vasconcelos	Soraia Chaves			
February 18	Bobby Cassidy	Bruno de Almeida		Documentary		
March 11	Cinerama	Inês Oliveira				
April 1	Ruínas	Manuel Mozos		Documentary		
April 8	Pare, Escute, Olhe	Jorge Pelicano		Documentary		
April 29	Fantasia Lusitana	João Canijo		Documentary		
May 6	Como Desenhar um Círculo Perfeito	Marco Martins				
May 13	Ilha da Cova da Moura	Rui Simões		Documentary		
May 13	The Strange Case of Angelica	Manoel de Oliveira				
June 3	Um Funeral à Chuva	Telmo Martins				
June 10	Muitos dias tem o Mês	Margarida Leitão		Documentary		
June 24	Duas Mulheres	João Mário Grilo				
July 22	Contraluz	Fernando Fragata				
August 5	O Inimigo sem Rosto	José Farinha				
September 16	Lisboa Domiciliária	Marta Pessoa		Documentary		
September 16	Marginais	Hugo Diogo				
September 23	Assalto ao Santa Maria	Francisco Manso				
September 29	Filme do Desassossego	João Botelho				
September 30	Embargo	António Ferreira				
October 7	Vai com o Vento	Ivo M. Ferreira		Documentary		
October 21	Mistérios de Lisboa	Raoul Ruiz				
October 28	Quero ser uma Estrela	José Carlos de Oliveira				
November 18	José and Pilar	Miguel Gonçalves Mendes		Documentary		

== See also ==
- 2010 in Portugal
