= List of Portuguese films of 2025 =

This is a list of films produced in Portugal in 2025:

#	Film	Director	Genre	Cast	Release	Notes
1	Nana Nana Meu Menino	Carlos Moreira	Drama, Thriller	Adélia Pereira, Carlos Moreira	Abril, 5	
2	Magellan (Portuguese: Magalhães)	Lav Diaz	Historical drama	Gael García Bernal	May, 18	
3	The Luminous Life (Portuguese: A Vida Luminosa)	João Rosas	Drama	Francisco Melo, Cécile Matignon, Federica Balbi	June, 26	
4	The Pianista	Nuno Bernardo	Drama	Miguel Borges, Gonçalo Almeida, Teresa Tavares	September, 11	
5	The Portuguese House (Portuguese: A Quinta)	Avelina Prat	Drama	Manolo Solo, Maria de Medeiros, Branka Katić. Rita Cabaço	July, 31	

== See also ==
- 2025 in Portugal
- 2025 in film
- List of Portuguese films of 2024
