= Don't Take the Name of God in Vain =

- No pronunciarás el nombre de Dios en vano
- Directed by: Josep Guirao
- Written by: Josep Guirao
- Based on: The Branch by Mike Resnick
- Starring: Pau Barredo; Emilio Guirao; Víctor Apolinarios; Josep Guirao; José María Blanco; Joan Frank Charansonnet
- Release date: 1999
- Running time: 32 minutes
- Country: Andorra
- Language: Spanish
- Budget: 534,000 ₧ (US$3,814)

Don't Take the Name of God in Vain (Spanish: No pronunciarás el nombre de Dios en vano) is a 1999 Andorran short film directed by Josep Guirao. It is 32 minutes long and based on the novel The Branch (1984) by Mike Resnick.

== Plot ==
The film is set in Andorra in the year 2046. A crime lord has arranged for a gathering of religious leaders, intended to answer a single question: How can one identify the true messiah? While they argue over the expected qualities of this savior figure, a man claiming to be the Son of God is revealed to be held at a nearby location.

== Production ==
The film uses low lighting and simple props to create its atmosphere. It seems to have been an inexpensive production, similar to a one-act theatrical play.

== Release ==
It was released in the US film festival circuit, including the Brooklyn Film Festival and the Miami International Film Festival.
