= List of Greek films before 1940 =

A list of notable films produced in Greece before 1940 ordered by year of release.

== 1910s–1930s ==
Title	Director	Cast	Genre	Notes
1915
Golfo (Γκόλφω)	Konstadinos Bahatoris	Olympia Damaskou	Romance	IMDb
1917
O Aniforos tou Golgotha (Ο ανήφορος του Γολγοθά)	Dimos Vratsanos	Yorgos Ploutis	Drama	IMDb
I Prika tis Annoulas (Η προίκα της Αννούλας)	Dimos Vratsanos			IMDb
1925
I Apagogi tis nifis (Η απαγωγή της νύφης)	Alexandros Ardanof	Yannis Andoniadis	Drama	IMDb
1927
Eros kai kymata (Έρως και κύματα)	Dimitris Gaziadis	Miranta Myrat, Dimitris Tsakiris	Romantic drama	IMDb
1929
Astero (Αστέρω)	Dimitris Gaziadis	Aliki Theodorides, Costas Moussouris	Romantic drama	IMDb
Maria Pentagiotissa (Μαρία Πενταγιώτισσα)	Ahilleas Madras	Vasilis Avlonitis		IMDb
To Labaro tou 21 (Το λάβαρο του 21)	Kostas Leloudas	Manos Katrakis	History/ Drama	IMDb
1930
Oi Apahides ton Athinon (Οι απάχηδες των Αθηνών)	Dimitris Gaziadis	Petros Epitropakis, Mery Sagianou-Katseli	Musical drama	IMDb
1931
Daphnis and Chloe (Dafnis kai Hloi, Δάφνις και Χλόη)	Orestis Laskos	Apollon Marsyas, Loucy Matli	Romantic drama	IMDb
Etsi kaneis, san agapisis (Έτσι κάνεις, σαν αγαπήσεις)	Stathis Loupas	Stathis Loupas, Lora Valeri, Manos Katrakis	Romantic drama	IMDb
1932
O Agapitikos tis voskopoulas (Ο Αγαπητικός της βοσκοπούλας)	Dimitris Tsakiris	Nina Afentaki, Manos Katrakis	Romantic drama	IMDb
1933
The Wrong Road (Kakos dromos, Κακός δρόμος), (Tr. Fena yol)	Muhsin Ertugrul	Marika Kotopouli, Dimitris Myrat, Vassilis Logothetidis	Drama	Turkish-Greek co-production – IMDb
1938
When the Husband Travels (Otan o syzygos taxidevi, Όταν ο σύζυγος ταξιδεύει)	Togo Mizrahi	Manos Phillippides, Anna Kalouta, Marika Kalouta	Comedy	Greek-Egyptian co-production – IMDb
