= List of Ukrainian films of the 1990s =

- 1990 Посилка для Маргарет Тетчер / Package for Margaret Thatcher, directed by Vadym Kastelli
- 1991 Голод-33 / Famine-33, directed by Oles Yanchuk
- 1991 Козаки йдуть / Cossacks Go, directed by Serhiy Omelchuk
- 1991 Останній бункер / The Last Bunker, directed by Vadym Illienko
- 1991 Карпатське золото / Carpathian Gold, directed by Viktor Zhyvolub
- 1991 Чудо в краю забуття / Miracle in the Land of Oblivion, directed by Natalia Motuzko
- 1992 Чотири листи фанери / Four Sheets of Plywood, directed by Ivan Havryliuk and Saido Kurbanov
- 1992 Тарас Шевченко. Заповіт / Taras Shevchenko. Testament, directed by Stanislav Klymenko
- 1992 Вишневі ночі / Cherry Nights, directed by Arkadiy Mikulskyi
- 1993 Вперед, за скарбами гетьмана! / Hunt for Cossack Gold!, directed by Vadym Kastelli
- 1993 Гетьманські клейноди / Hetman's Regalia, directed by Leonid Osyka
- 1993 Фучжоу / Fuchzhou, directed by Mykhailo Illienko
- 1993 Тіні війни / Shadows of War, directed by Heorhiy Gongadze (documentary film)
- 1993 Сад Гетсиманський / Garden of Gethsemane, directed by Rostyslav Synko (by the novel of Ivan Bahriany)
- 1994 Тигролови / Tiger Catchers, directed by Rostyslav Synko (by the novel of Ivan Bahriany)
- 1994 Дорога на Січ / Road to Sich, directed by Serhiy Omelchuk
- 1995 Атентат - осіннє вбивство в Мюнхені / Assassination. An Autumn Murder in Munich, directed by Oles Yanchuk
- 1995 Москаль-чарівник / Moskal-Charivnyk, directed by Mykola Zasieiev-Rudenko
- 1995 Страчені світанки / Executed Dawns, directed by Hryhoriy Kokhan
- 1996 Операція "Контракт" / Operation "Contract", directed by Tamara Boiko
- 1997 Приятель небіжчика / A Friend of the Deceased, directed by Viacheslav Kryshtofovych
- 1997 Сьомий маршрут / The Seventh Route, directed by Mykhailo Illienko
- 1998 Тупик / Dead End, directed by Hryhoriy Kokhan
- 1999 Як коваль щастя шукав / How the Blacksmith Looked for Happiness, directed by Radomyr Vasylevsky
