= Forsaken World =

Forsaken World: War of Shadows
- Developer: Perfect World Entertainment
- Platform: Windows
- Release: 11 March 2011.
- Genre: MMORPG
- Mode: MMO

Forsaken World (Chinese: 神魔大陆2, commonly abbreviated as FW), is a 3D adventure and fantasy MMORPG with traditional Chinese settings, developed by Perfect World Entertainment's Beijing studio. Players can take on various roles depending on choice of race and choice of class within that race. Published in Russia by Nival (named as Dark Age), stopped in 2016.

The series is a spin-off of Perfect World Entertainment's flagship 2005 game Perfect World, and the title is based on it.

== Seasons ==
The game has gone through a series of several subtitles:

1. War of Shadows, as of 12 December 2012
2. Blood Harvest, as of 9 July 2014
3. Vengeance, as of 12 January 2016
4. Homecoming, as of 13 January 2017
5. Exordium, as of 1 January 2018
6. Voyage, as of 12 January 2019
7. Sleepless Carnival, as of 6 January 2021
8. Gods and Demons, as of 10 September 2021

== Closure ==
On 22 April 2022 there was an announcement that the servers would be closed (deleting all the characters) by 30 November 2022. Purchases were disabled April 28, with all March/April purchases converted into Arc credit for other games. Purchases from February and earlier would not be refunded.
