= List of Portuguese films of the 1930s =

A list of films produced in the Cinema of Portugal ordered by year of release in the 1930s. For an alphabetical list of Portuguese films see Category:Portuguese films

== 1930s ==
Title	Director	Cast	Genre	Notes
1923
A Sereia de Pedra	Roger Lion	Maria Emília Castelo Branco, Gil Clary, Max Maxudian	Drama	Shown widely in Brazil also.
1930
Maria do Mar	José Leitão de Barros		Drama	
1931
A Severa	José Leitão de Barros			
Douro, Faina Fluvial	Manoel de Oliveira		Documentary	
1933
A Canção de Lisboa (Lisbon Song)	José Cottinelli Telmo		Comedy	
1937
Azenhas do Mar	Armando de Miranda			Documentary
Maria Papoila	José Leitão de Barros		Comedy	
1938
A Rosa do Adro	Chianca de Garcia			
1939
Aldeia da Roupa Branca	Chianca de Garcia		Comedy	
