= The Self Seeker =

1929 film

- Russian: Шкурник
- Directed by: Mykola Shpykovskyi
- Written by: Vadym Okhremenko; Boris Rozenzvejg; Mykola Shpykovskyi
- Starring: Ivan Sadovskiy; Luka Lyashenko; Dmytro Kapka
- Cinematography: Aleksei Pankratyev
- Production company: All-Ukrainian Photo Cinema Administration
- Release date: 1929
- Running time: 75 minutes
- Country: Soviet Union
- Languages: Silent film Russian intertitles

The Self Seeker (Russian: Шкурник, romanized: Shkurnyk) is a 1929 Soviet Ukrainian comedy road film directed by Mykola Shpykovskyi.

== Plot ==
The film takes place during the Civil War in Ukraine. It follows Apollon Shmyguev, a man who is "neutral" to all regimes and is concerned only with his own selfish interests. Riding a Bactrian camel throughout Ukraine, he attempts to profit from each side of the conflict, including the Reds, the Whites, and the anarchists.

== Cast ==
- Ivan Sadovskiy as Apollon Shmyguev
- Luka Lyashenko as the Head of Partisans
- Dmytro Kapka as the Colonel
- Dora Feller-Shpikovska as the Commissar
- S. Vlasenko as Chief of the bootlegging check-point

== Reception ==
The film received mixed reception upon its release. In Osip Mandelstam's review of the film, he noted the particularly fairytale-like approach to the storyline and the outstanding cinematography. However, he also lamented that the director had failed to adequately develop the plot and had ruined it with "unnecessary propaganda": "some evil genius told Shpikovsky that, alongside the folkloric theme of the camel spy, and even in contrast to it, the theme of labour and farming must be strengthened and developed." The film was soon withdrawn from distribution by the State Committee for Cinematography, which criticised its "vile lampooning" of the civil war and depiction of the Red Army and Soviet authorities as idiotic.

For a long time, the film was considered lost, but in the 2000s, it was discovered in a film archive, restored, and shown at the Kyiv International Film Festival. Contemporary critics, in contrast to Mandelstam, have praised the film's "revolutionary, avant-garde nature," its timeliness, and its freedom from clichés and ideology. In its 2021 list of the 100 best films in the history of Ukrainian cinema, the National Oleksandr Dovzhenko Film Centre placed The Self Seeker at #31.
