= José Nascimento (film director) =

Portuguese film director (born 1947)

- Born: September 18, 1947 (age 79); Lisbon, Portugal
- Occupation: Film director

José Nascimento (born 1947) is a Portuguese film director.

== Filmography ==
- Os Lobos (2007)
- Too Late (2000)
- Reporter X (1987)
- Silêncios do Olhar (documentary) (2016)
- Tavira Islâmica (documentary) (2012)
- Terra de Pão Terra de Luta (documentary) (1976)
- Pela Razão que Têm (documentary) (1976)
