= List of Portuguese films of 2024 =

This is a list of films produced in Portugal in 2024:

#	Film	Director	Genre	Cast	Release	Notes
1	Vive e Deixa Andar (lit. Live and let go)		comedy	Eduardo Madeira	October, 31	
2	Amelia's Children	Gabriel Abrantes	horror		January, 18	
	Grand Tour	Miguel Gomes	Travel documentary and sentimental drama			
