= List of Nagorno-Karabakh conflict films =

Below is an incomplete list of feature films, television films or television series which include events of the Nagorno-Karabakh conflict. This list does not include documentaries, short films.

== 1990s ==
Year	Country	Main title (Alternative title)	Original title (Original script)	Director	Subject
1990	Soviet Union	Trap	Ловушка; Tələ	Rasim Ismailov	Adventure, Crime, Thriller.
1993	Azerbaijan	Lachin Pass	Laçın keçidi	Kuban Uğur İlhan	Lachin corridor
1993	Azerbaijan	At the request of Qadir	Qədirin sorağında	Tofig Mammadov	
1993	Azerbaijan	The Scream	Fəryad	Jeyhun Mirzayev	Drama, War.
1993	Azerbaijan	Where	Haray	Oruc Qurbanov	Khojaly massacre
1995	Azerbaijan	The sound left on the rocks	Qayalarda qalan səs	Rovshan Almuradly	Drama, War.
1995	Azerbaijan	Hope	Ümid	Gyulbeniz Yusuf Azimzade	
1995	Armenia	The Artsakh Unfinished Diary		Hovhannes Hovhannisyan; Evert Payazat	War.
1995	Azerbaijan	Boy on a white horse	Ağ atlı oğlan	Anwar Abluj	Drama, War.
1997	Azerbaijan	Wolf cub	Canavar balası	Marhaim Farzalibekov	Drama, Thriller, War.
1998	Azerbaijan	Family	Ailə	Rustam Ibrahimbekov; Ramiz Hasanoglu	Drama.
1998	Azerbaijan	Hotel room	Otel otağı	Rasim Ojagov	Drama.
1998	Azerbaijan	Blonde Bride	Sarı gəlin	Yaver Rzayev	

== 2000s ==
Year	Country	Main title (Alternative title)	Original title (Original script)	Director	Subject
2002	France	Aram		Robert Kechichian	Crime, Drama, History, Thriller.
2005	Azerbaijan	Hostage	Girov	Eldar Quliyev	Drama.
2005	Georgia	A Trip to Karabakh	გასეირნება ყარაბაღში	Levan Tutberidze	Action, Adventure, Drama, Romance, War.
2006	United States	Destiny	Ճակատագիր	Vahe Khachatryan	Action.
2006	Armenia	Unfired bullets	Չկրակված փամփուշտներ	Samvel Tadevosyan	Aghvan Minasyan
2006	Azerbaijan	Lie	Yalan	Ramiz Azizbeyli	Drama.
2007	Azerbaijan; Russia	Caucasia	Qafqaz	Farid Gumbatov	Drama.
2007	Azerbaijan	We will return	Biz qayıdacağıq	Elxan Qasımov	Drama.
2008	Azerbaijan	The Selected One: Sechilmish	Seçilən	Masud Abperver	Drama.
2008	Azerbaijan	Good Morning, My Angel	Günaydın, mələyim!	Ogtay Mirgasimov	Drama, Music, Romance.
2008	Azerbaijan	Fortress	Qala	Shamil Najafzade	Drama.
2008	Armenia	The Dawn of the Sad Street	Տխուր փողոցի լուսաբացը	Albert Mkrtchyan	Drama, War.
2009	Georgia	The Conflict Zone	კონფლიქტის ზონა (გასეირნება ყარაბაღში 2)	Vano Burduli	Drama, War.
2009	Azerbaijan	The Dolls	Kuklalar	Çingiz Rasulzada	Drama.

== 2010s ==
Year	Country	Main title (Alternative title)	Original title (Original script)	Director	Subject
2010	Armenia	Excess	Ավելորդ	Murad Janibekyan; Vahagn Khacheryan	Action, Crime, Drama.
2010	Azerbaijan	Memory	Yaddaş	Vahid Mustafayev	Drama.
2011	Armenia	Joan and the Voices	Ժաննան և ձայները	Mikayel Vatinyan	Drama.
2012	Armenia	From Two Worlds as a Keepsake	Երկու աշխարհից ի հիշատակ	Nika Shek	Drama, History, War.
2012	Azerbaijan	Khoja	Xoca	Vahid Mustafayev	Drama. Khojaly massacre
2012	Azerbaijan	Hail	Dolu	Elkhan Jafarov	War.
2012	Armenia	If Only Everyone	Եթե բոլորը	Nataliya Belyauskene	Drama, War.
2013	Armenia	Broken Childhood	Ընդհատված մանկություն	Jivan Avetisyan	Drama, War.
2014	Azerbaijan	I am returning home	Mən evə qayıdıram	Samir Karimoghlu	
2014	Armenia	Tevanik	Թևանիկ	Jivan Avetisyan	Drama, War.
2014	Azerbaijan	Nabat		Elchin Musaoglu	Drama, War.
2015	Azerbaijan; Belarus	Incomplete Memories	Yarımçıq xatirələr	Elkhan Jafarov	Biography, Drama, History, War.
2016	Armenia	Hot Country, Cold Winter	Շոգ երկիր, ցուրտ ձմեռ	David Safarian	Drama.
2016	Armenia	Life and Fight	Կյանք ու կռիվ	Mher Mkrtchyan	Drama, History, Romance, War.
2016	Armenia	The Last Inhabitant	Վերջին բնակիչը	Jivan Avetisyan	Drama, War.
2016	Azerbaijan	Special Purpose Worship	Xüsusi təyinatlı İbad	Natiq Novruzov	Ibad Huseynov
2017	Armenia	The Line 2: 25 Years Later	Կյանք ու կռիվ 2. 25 տարի անց	Mher Mkrtchyan	Drama.
2018	Russia; Armenia	I'll come back home		Darya Shumakova	Drama.
2018	Azerbaijan	Special Purpose Worship 2	Xüsusi təyinatlı İbad 2	Natiq Novruzov	Ibad Huseynov
2018	Azerbaijan	Until the last breath	Son nəfəsədək	Elnur Aliyev	
2019	Armenia	My Cross	Իմ խաչը	Shavarsh Vartanyan	War.
2019	Armenia; Lithuania; Germany; France; Bulgaria; Czech Republic; Italy; United States	Gate to Heaven	Դրախտի դարպասը	Jivan Avetisyan	Drama.

== 2020s ==
Year	Country	Main title (Alternative title)	Original title (Original script)	Director	Subject
2022	Armenia	Call of Blood	Արյան կանչը	Armen Dallakian	Second Nagorno-Karabakh War
2022	Armenia	It's Spring...	Գարուն ա...	Roman Musheghyan	Drama. 2016 Nagorno-Karabakh conflict
2022	Azerbaijan	Old suitcases	Köhnə çamadanlar	Saida Hagverdiyeva	
2022	Azerbaijan; Italy; Iran; France	Banu		Tahmina Rafaella	Drama.
2022	Azerbaijan	Life Seems to Be Beautiful	Həyat, deyəsən, gözəldir	Vagif Mustafayev	Comedy, Drama.
2025	Azerbaijan	Native Land	Doğma torpaq	İlqar Safat	Action.

== Science fiction, fantasy, and horror films ==
Year	Country	Main title (Alternative title)	Original title (Original script)	Director	Subject
2004	Azerbaijan	The future left behind	Arxada qalmış gələcək	Rufat Asadov	Fantasy, War.
2005	United States; Czech Republic; Russia; Armenia	Pterodactyl		Mark L. Lester	Action, Adventure, Horror, Sci-Fi, Thriller.

== Television films ==
Year	Country	Main title (Alternative title)	Original title (Original script)	Director	Subject
1998	Azerbaijan	The Red Snow	Qırmızı qar	Marhaim Farzalibekov	Drama, War. Khojaly massacre
2009	Azerbaijan		Bulağıstan	Masud Abperver	Drama.

== Television series ==
Year	Country	Main title (Alternative title)	Original title (Original script)	Director	Subject
2007	Armenia	Do Not Be Afraid	Մի վախեցիր	Aram Shahbazyan	Drama.
2010	Armenia	Heirs	Ժարանգներե		
2010	Armenia	Heirs 2	Ժարանգներե 2		Drama.
2015-16	Armenia	On the Border	Սահմանին	Roman Musheghyan	Reality-TV.
