= Fish Eye Art Cultural Foundation =

Armenian film production charity

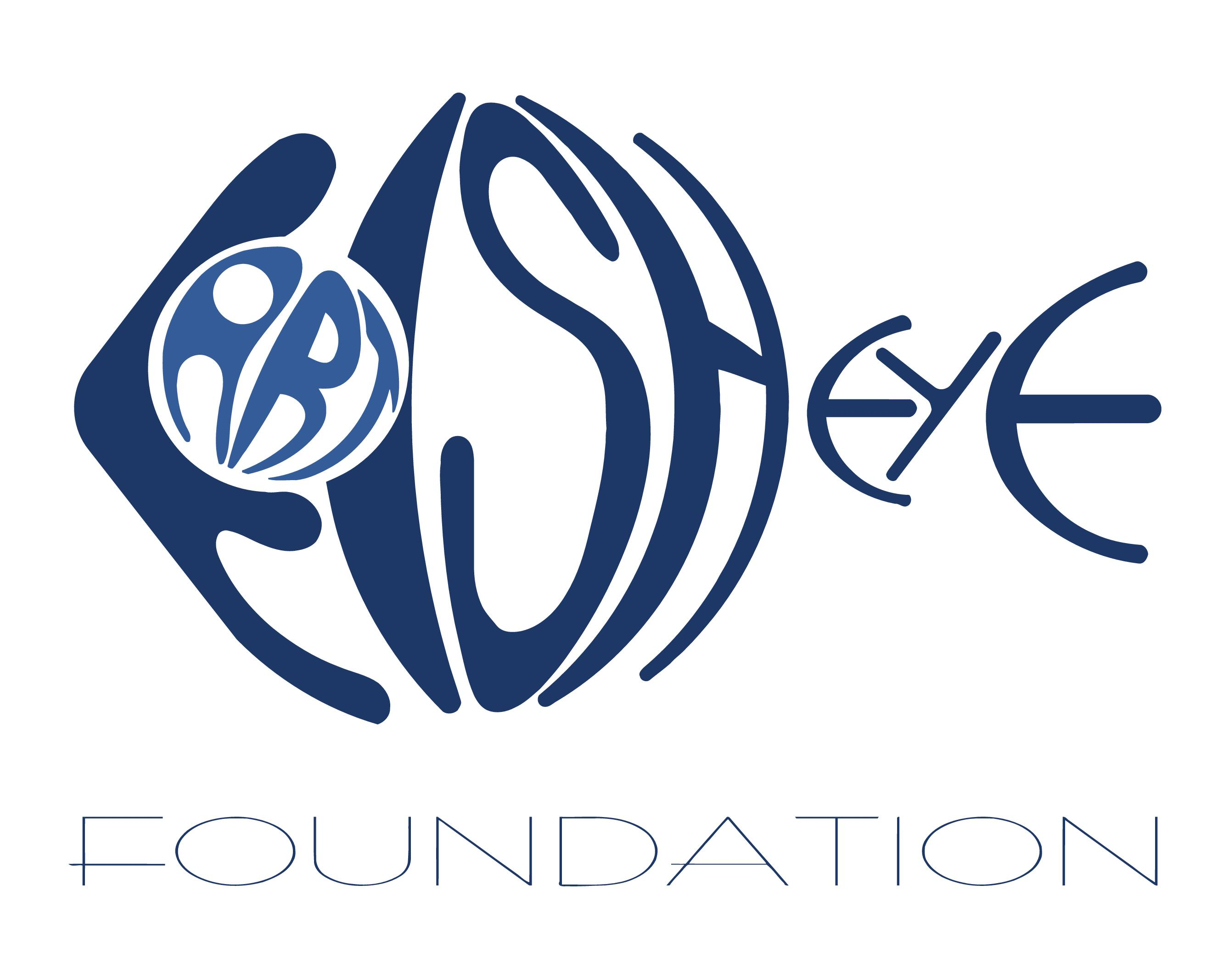
Fish eye Art Cultural Foundation logo

The Fish Eye Art Cultural Foundation is an Armenian cultural group. It was created in Armenia in 2014. The Foundation's mission is to create cultural projects, particularly films, based on universal human values. It aims to create high-quality films that will appeal to both Armenian and foreign audiences.

Since its inception, the Foundation has collaborated with the National Cinema Center of Armenia and Lithuanian Artbox Production House.

== History ==
In 2014 they produced the first Armenian-Lithuanian feature film, Tevanik.

The Foundation's second feature film, The Last Inhabitant, was created in 2016, again in collaboration with the National Cinema Center and Lithuanian Artbox. Production and post-production was supported by Apricot Stone of Sweden, Alpha Dogs, Inc. in the United States, the Mosaics Art & Cultural Foundation in United States and State University of Lebanon.

The Last Inhabitant was presented at the 69th Cannes International Film Festival, Le Marché du Film. The Première took place in Armenia at the 13th Golden Apricot film festival and was also submitted for 2017 Golden Globe Awards, for consideration of Best Foreign Language Film. Additionally, the film was presented at the 20th Shanghai International Film Festival in the Panorama Program as well as at the 74th Venice International Film Festival as part of the Venice Production Bridge. It was awarded Best Feature Film at the Scandinavian International Film Festival in Helsinki, Finland. HBO bought rights to air the film in Eastern European countries. The Fish Eye Art Cultural Foundation was represented by Galloping Films PTY LTD for worldwide distribution of The Last Inhabitant.

The Foundation's third full-length feature film was Gate to Heaven, a drama. The film was presented in English, Armenian, German, and French but is primarily in English. Richard Sammel and Tatiana Spivakova played lead roles. Sos Janibekyan, Naira Zakaryan, Leonardas Pobedonoscevas, Nina Kronjager, and Benedict Freitag played supporting roles.

The European Work in Progress in Cologne 2019 selected the Gate to Heaven film project, which took place in October. The premiere was held in Armenia on October 17, 2019 with over 600 attendees.

== Projects ==
The film projects Revival and Black List are in production. The preliminary steps of these two film projects begun February 2019 at the European Film Market in Berlin, Germany.

Director Jivan Avetisyan was selected as part of the Berlinale Talents 2020 with the film project Revival. The editors of Deutsche Welle selected Avetisyan from the Berlinale Talents for a documentary regarding his films. The film is slated for production in Spring/Summer 2021.

The storyline of Black List is about Alexander Lapshin – a Russian-Israeli travel blogger who faces a political scandal while visiting forbidden territory in the Caucases.
