= The Scoundrel (1988 film) =

- Directed by: Vagif Mustafayev
- Written by: Ramiz Fataliyev; Vagif Mustafayev
- Produced by: Azerbaijanfilm
- Starring: Mamuka Kikaleishvili; Hasanagha Turabov; Yashar Nuri; Rasim Balayev
- Edited by: G. Zhuravlyova
- Production company: Azerbaijanfilm
- Release date: 1988
- Running time: 97 min.
- Country: Soviet Union
- Languages: Azerbaijani, Russian

The Scoundrel (Azerbaijani: Yaramaz, Russian: Мерзавец) is a full-length Soviet film shot in Baku in 1988. Directed by Vagif Mustafayev, this comedy film exposes the corruption and the decadence of the late Soviet bureaucracy in Azerbaijan SSR through the eyes of a naive Azerbaijani adult man, Hatem, played by Georgian actor Mamuka Kikaleishvili.

== Cast ==
- Mamuka Kikaleishvili - Hatem
- Hasanagha Turabov - Gazanfar
- Yashar Nuri - Mashalla
- Larisa Borodina - Irada
- Aghahuseyn Kerimov - Mirza Baba
- Hamlet Khanizade - Alasgar
- Melik Dadashov - Hatem's co-worker
- Zernigar Aghakishiyeva - mother-in-law
- Haji Ismayilov - Haji
- Rasim Balayev - minister's assistant
- Saida Guliyeva - Hatem's wife
- Mukhtar Maniyev - thief
- Eldaniz Zeynalov - Hatem's co-worker
- Rahib Aliyev - Hatem's co-worker
- Nazim Aghayev - Mukhtar
- Lala Baghirova - secretary
- Brilliant Dadashova - neighbor
- Talat Rahmanov - singer Balayan
- Jahangir Aslanoghlu - Bahram
- Chingiz Mustafayev - homeless
- Ramiz Melikov - dancer
- Basti Jafarova
- Huseyn Muradov - minister

== See also ==
- Azerbaijani films of the 1980s
