= Avtandil Makharadze =

Georgian actor (born 1943)

- Born: July 16, 1943 (age 82); Batumi, Georgia
- Occupation: Actor
- Years active: 1965–present

Avtandil Ivanovich Makharadze (Georgian: ავთანდილ მახარაძე; born 16 July 1943) is a Georgian actor.

He was born in Batumi. Active since the 1970s, Makharadze started his acting career as a student at Shota Rustaveli Theatre and Film University, with performances in the acts of his fellow students. His role in the play The Merchant of Venice, where he played Shylock, caught the eyes of critics and the public. He worked at Shota Rustaveli Theatre until 1991, where he played over 50 roles.

In 1984, he had success in the Moscow Art Theatre, where he played the main role in the play Collapse (Jaqo's Dispossessed).

The same year, he played dual main part in the famous film by Tengiz Abuladze Repentance (those of Varlam and Abel Aravidze). In 1987, at the Cannes Film Festival, Repentance won the Grand Prize of the Jury, Prize of the Ecumenical Jury and the FIPRESCI Award. The same year, at the Chicago Film Festival, he received Silver Hugo Award for the best male performance. He won the first ever Nika Award at the Moscow International Film Festival in 1987 as well.

In 1989, he starred alongside Isabelle Huppert, Bernard Blier, Erland Josephson, Richard Berry and Miki Manojlović in Aleksandar Petrović's last film Migrations.

In 1991, Makharadze played the main role in the film of Mikheil Kalatozishvili'sThe Beloved. The Film was nominated for Golden Bear at the Berlin International Film Festival.

In 1993, he received Golden Eagle at The Tbilisi International Film Festival for the best male performance in Vagif Mustafayev film Out of.

In 2004, Makharadze starred in another Vagif Mustafayev film National Bomb, which was nominated for Golden St. George at the Moscow International Film Festival. Makharadze won the best male performance award at the Smolensk Film Festival for his performance.

Makharadze played Joseph Stalin in the 2005 BBC TV series Archangel, starring opposite Daniel Craig.

== Selected filmography ==
- Scary Mother (2017)
- All Gone (2012)
- Archangel (2005)
- National Bomb (2004)
- The Beloved (1991)
- Repentance (1984/1987 film)
