= Birthday (1977 film) =

1977 Soviet film

- Directed by: Rasim Ojagov
- Written by: Rustam Ibrahimbeyov
- Produced by: Azerbaijanfilm
- Starring: Haji Ismayilov, David Uplisashvili, Yashar Nuri, Fuad Poladov
- Release date: 1977
- Running time: 71 min.
- Country: Soviet Union
- Languages: Azerbaijani, Russian

Birthday (Azerbaijani: Ad günü), also translated as The Birthday or The Birthday Party is a 1977 Soviet film directed by Rasim Ojagov and based on Rustam Ibrahimbeyov's short stories "Birthday" and "Business Trip".

== Plot ==
The characters are contemporaries in the late 1970s Azerbaijan SSR with differing visions of the world, yet they share a true and lasting friendship.

== Cast ==
- Haji Ismayilov as Mustafa
- David Uplisashvili as Ali
- Yashar Nuri as Eldar
- Fuad Poladov as Nazim

== See also ==
- Azerbaijani films of the 1970s
