= Rahib =

- Rahib Aliyev, Azerbaijani actor
- Rahib Məmmədov, Azerbaijani hurdler
