= The Window (1991 film) =

1991 Azerbaijani drama film

- Directed by: Hasan Abluj; Anvar Abluj
- Written by: Isa Malikzadeh
- Produced by: Azerbaijanfilm
- Starring: Valeh Kerimov; Yashar Nuri; Ilham Babayev
- Music by: Mobil Babayev
- Distributed by: Azerbaijanfilm
- Release date: 1991
- Running time: 82 min.
- Country: Soviet Union
- Language: Azerbaijani

The Window (Azerbaijani: Pəncərə) is a 1991 Soviet drama film directed by Hasan Abluj and Anvar Abluj, based on the novel Jackdawses' Nowruz (Azerbaijani: Dolaşaların Novruz Bayramı) by Isi Malikzade.

== Plot ==
The film reveals the contradictions between the "educator"-teachers and the "educated"-students in the boarding school, which is actually an orphanage, where lawlessness, violence, hypocrisy, and cruelty prevail. Little Ahsan (Ilham Babayev), forced to live in such contradictory conditions, is unable to adapt to these conditions, misses his native home, and finds the only way out - by throwing himself out of the window and perishes.

The film "Window" sounds like a warning, calling for a radical change in the educational system that cripples the fate of children.

== Cast ==
- Ilham Babayev — Ahsan
- Valeh Karimov — Ahsa's father
- Yashar Nuri — Nasib
- Anwar Abluj — director
- Ruslan Nasirov — Nomad
- Simuzar Agakishiyeva — Narmina
- Elkhan Bayramov — Savalan
- Abbasgulu Abluj — Wasif
- Zemfira Aliyeva — Sultannisa
- Tavakkul Ismayilov — Burkhan
- Khalil Ismayilov — Jeyhun
- Mammadbagir Hasanov — Booty
- Ramin Malikov — Rovshan
- Hasan Abluj — Rovsha's father
- Farid Hajiyev — Zaki
- Nazir Aliyev is Zaki's father
- Emil Bayramov — Sacrifice
- Vusala Nabiyeva — Gumral
- Rovshan Jahangirov — Samad
- Abdul Mikayilov — Ahmed
- Elkhan Guliyev - militia captain
- Fikret Mammadov - militia lieutenant
- Lalazar Mustafayeva - mother

== See also ==
- Cinema of Azerbaijan
- Azerbaijani films from the 90s
