= Jivan Avetisyan =

Armenian film director

Jivan Avetisyan Ջիվան Ավետիսյան
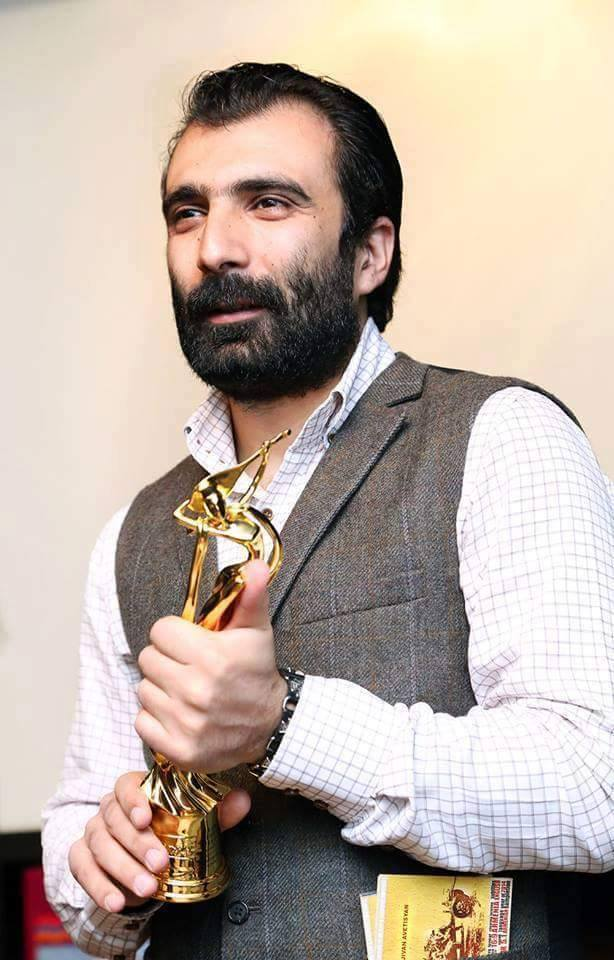
- Born: 19 November 1981; Gyumri, Armenia
- Education: Yerevan State Institute of Theatre and Cinematography
- Occupation: Director
- Years active: 1996 – present
- Notable work: The Last Inhabitant (2016); Gate to Heaven (2019); Revival (2025)
- Website: feacf.com

Jivan Avetisyan (Armenian: Ջիվան Ավետիսյան; born 19 Novermber 1981) is an Armenian filmmaker. He directed the films Tevanik, The Last Inhabitant, and Gate to Heaven. Avetisyan is a participant of CineLink Producers’ Lab 2024 and a member of the European Film Academy.

Avetisyan has participated in multiple international film festivals including Golden Apricot and Shanghai International Film Festival. Avetisyan's films have also won in “Best Feature Film” and “Best Director” categories.

His filmography includes over ten documentaries including Karabakh a Hidden Treasure, short films including Broken Childhood.

== Early life and education ==
Jivan Avetisyan was born on 19 Novermber 1981 in Gyumri, and he was raised in Khachmach, a village on the outskirts of Stepanakert, Artsakh. He was raised during the First Nagorno-Karabakh War. Avetisyan attended the Stepanakert No. 9 secondary school. As a child, he wanted to become a filmmaker.

From 1993 to 1997, Avetisyan was apart of the theater group at the Stepanakert Children's creative center. After joining this group, Avetisyan enrolled in a 3-month directing course at the Public Television Company of Armenia. However, in 1999, Avetisyan served in a “Mandatory” military service in the Defense Army of the Republic of Nagorno-Karabakh until 2001. From 2002 to 2007, Avetisyan attended the Yerevan State Institute of Theatre and Cinematography.

Avetisyan is an alumnus of Berlinale Talents 2020 and MIDPOINT Institute.

== Career ==
Avetisyan's filmmaking career began as the Lighting Engineer at the Stepanakert Drama Theatre after Vahram Papazyan in 1996–97. From 1998 to 1999 was a lighting engineer and then director at Artsakh Public TV. In 2003 he worked his way up to becoming the film and program director at the TV company “Yerkir Media”. Avetisyan's passion for the art of filmmaking continued, and since 2009, he then served as the main director of “Yerkir Media”.

Avetisyan serves as the executive director of The Fish eye Art Cultural Foundation. Since its inception in 2014, the foundation has created three feature films: Tevanik, The Last Inhabitant, and Gate to Heaven. In 2021, Avetisyan created the production company, LifeTree Pictures LLC.

The first feature film, Tevanik, has been recognized in over twenty international film festivals claiming over twenty awards including Best Feature Film. The film was translated into more than 25 languages and screened in more than 30 countries and 100 cities around the world.

Avetisyan second film, The Last Inhabitant, was filmed in Khachmach in 2015. The Last Inhabitant featured Houmayun Ershadi and was screened at A-class international film festivals including Shanghai and Venice. It won Best Feature Film and Best Actor Award at the Scandinavian International Film Festival. It also won the Audience Award for "Best Independent Film". It was later acquired for licensing and distribution rights for HBO Eastern Europe.

His third feature film, Gate to Heaven, featured Richard Sammel. Gate to Heaven was selected for European Work in Progress Cologne. The film was also selected in the Official Program of the Las Cruces International Film Festival, the Salento International Film Festival, and the Ontario International Film Festival. It also received the Global Music Award - Silver Medal / Outstanding Achievement “Regarding the Controversial and Critical Acclaimed Film.” The film was selected at the Moscow International Film Festival; however, it was later removed due to the political pressures received from Azerbaijani officials because of the Artsakh War. Gate to Heaven's composer, Michele Josia, was a finalist for "Best Score of the Month " at the American Tracks Music Award. Gate to Heaven was included as part of the Cinema for Peace Virtual Peace Conference held on December 12, 2020. Additionally, the film was screened in Guzzo Cinemas in Toronto in 2021 and at the Guzzo Mega-Plex Spheretech in Montreal. The film ran from October 16 through November 4, 2021. Gate to Heaven was also included in the 2022 AMC independent programming schedule, a highly competitive program that accepts only 4-8 titles every year. The film saw its theatrical release with AMC nationwide in the US in October 2021. The film has also been available on EST/VOD on France's UniverCiné. Recently, it has also been available on the SBS On Demand platform.

Avetisyan has participated in multiple international film festivals including Golden Apricot and Shanghai International Film Festival. Avetisyan's films have also won in “Best Feature Film” category.

His fourth feature film Revival (release date 2025), Coproduction Armenia/Lithuania/ Cyprus, is an identity-quest drama with near-future Artificial Intelligence (AI). The film's is in the post production stage and features Armand Assante, Maia Morgenstern, and Heino Ferch.

Avetisyan is currently developing his next feature film, Angels 2020, the animated film Baa’bel and the 8-part mini TV series The Stateless Diplomat.

In 2020, he was selected to become a subject of a documentary by Deutsche Welle.

== Filmography ==
=== Film ===
Year	Title
1999	My first love
2001	Illusion
2006	Life Unobserved
2007	The Dawn is peaceful in Artsakh
2010	Dream Found
2013	Broken Childhood
2014	Tevanik
2016	The Last Inhabitant
2019	Gate to Heaven

=== Documentary films ===
Year	Title
2004	Towards the Wind
2005	Along the Paths of One's Own History
2009	Veiled Armenians
2009	Promotion films
2009	Wick filled with Smoke
2010	Protocol Trap
2010	Vital Movements
2010	Quartered Cross
2010	Divided Couple
2010	Saved Fraction
2010	Enemy Hammer
2011	Armenians from Mrav to Araks River
2011	Karabakh, a Hidden Treasure
2012	Road to ...

== Accomplishments ==
- The Armenian National Committee of America Eastern Region (ANCA-ER) honored Avetisyan with the ANCA Eastern Region Freedom Award at its 16th Annual Gala in Detroit (2022).
- Avetisyan was also awarded a gold medal by the municipality of Nea Smyrni, Athens.
- Member of Jury at the Hurghada International Youth Film Festival (2023)
- Special award of ''Haykyan Awards'' of the Youth Foundation of Armenia was awarded.
