= Poladov =

Poladov is a surname. Notable people with the surname include:

- Fuad Poladov (1948–2018), Azerbaijani actor;
- Ruslan Poladov (born 1979), Azerbaijani footballer.
