= National Bomb =

2004 film

- Directed by: Vagif Mustafayev
- Written by: Vagif Mustafayev
- Starring: Yashar Nuri
- Release date: 21 June 2004 (Moscow)
- Running time: 104 minutes
- Countries: Azerbaijan; Russia
- Languages: Azerbaijani; Russian

National Bomb (Azerbaijani: Milli bomba) is a 2004 Azerbaijani-Russian comedy film directed by Vagif Mustafayev. It was entered into the 26th Moscow International Film Festival.

== Cast ==
- Yashar Nuri
- Nuriya Akhmedova
- Saida Kulieva
- Avtandil Makharadze
