= The Beloved (1991 film) =

1991 film

- Directed by: Mikheil Kalatozishvili
- Written by: Prosper Mérimée; Mikheil Kalatozishvili
- Starring: Avtandil Makharadze
- Cinematography: Archil Akhvlediani
- Production company: Kartuli Pilmi
- Release date: 1991
- Running time: 110 minutes
- Country: Soviet Union
- Languages: Russian, Georgian

The Beloved (Georgian: Rcheuli) is a 1991 Soviet-era Georgian drama film directed by Mikheil Kalatozishvili. It was entered into the 42nd Berlin International Film Festival.

== Cast ==
- Avtandil Makharadze
- Nineli Chankvetadze
- Larisa Guzeyeva
- Luka Khundadze
- Maya Bagrationi
- Dato Akhobadze (as David Akhobadze)
- Leo Antadze (as Levan Antadze)
- Guram Mgaloblishvili
- Gogi Margvelashvili
- Pridon Guledani
