= Repentance (1987 film) =

1984 film

- Film poster
- Directed by: Tengiz Abuladze
- Written by: Nana Janelidze; Tengiz Abuladze
- Starring: Avtandil Makharadze
- Cinematography: Mikhail Agranovich
- Edited by: Guliko Omadze
- Music by: Nana Dzanelidze
- Production company: Georgian Film Studio
- Distributed by: Cannon Film (US theatrical); RUSCICO (DVD)
- Release date: 17 May 1987 (Cannes)
- Running time: 153 minutes
- Country: Soviet Union
- Languages: Georgian, Russian

Repentance (მონანიება, translit. Monanieba; Покаяние, Pokayanie) is a 1987 Soviet art film directed by Tengiz Abuladze. The film was produced in 1984, but it was banned from release in the Soviet Union for its semi-allegorical critique of Stalinism. It premiered at the 1987 Cannes Film Festival, winning the FIPRESCI Prize, Grand Prize of the Jury, and the Prize of the Ecumenical Jury. The film was selected as the Soviet entry for the Best Foreign Language Film at the 60th Academy Awards, but was not accepted as a nominee. In July 2021, the film was shown in the Cannes Classics section at the 2021 Cannes Film Festival.

== Plot ==
Repentance is set in a small Georgian town. The film starts with the scene of a woman preparing cakes. A man in a chair is reading from a newspaper that the town's mayor, Varlam Aravidze (Avtandil Makharadze) has died. One day after the funeral the corpse of the mayor turns up in the garden of his son's house. The corpse is reburied, only to reappear again in the garden. A woman, Ketevan Barateli (Zeinab Botsvadze), is eventually arrested and accused of digging up the corpse. She defends herself and states that Varlam does not deserve to be buried as he was responsible for a Stalin-like regime of terror responsible for the disappearance of her parents and her friends. She is put on trial and gives her testimony, with the story of Varlam's regime being told in flashbacks.

During the trial, Varlam's son Abel (Avtandil Makharadze) denies any wrongdoings by his father and his lawyer tries to get Ketevan declared insane. Varlam's grandson Tornike (Merab Ninidze) is shocked by the revelations about the crimes of his grandfather. He ultimately commits suicide. Abel himself then throws Varlam's corpse off a cliff on the outskirts of the town.

At the end, the film returns to the scene of the woman preparing a cake. An old woman is asking her at the window whether this is the road that leads to the church. The woman replies that the road is Varlam Street and will not lead to the temple. The old woman replies: "What good is a road if it doesn't lead to a church?"

== Cast ==
Abuladze cast several of his family members in leading roles in the film.

- Avtandil Makharadze as Varlam Aravidze and as middle-aged Abel Aravidze
- Dato Kemkhadze as young Abel Aravidze, son of Varlam Aravidze
- Ia Ninidze as Guliko, Abel's wife
- Zeinab Botsvadze as Ketevan Barateli
- Ketevan Abuladze as Nino Barateli
- David Giorgobiani (Edisher Giorgobiani) as Sandro Barateli
- Kakhi Kavsadze as Mikheil Koresheli
- Merab Ninidze as Tornike, Abel's and Guliko's son
- Nino Zaqariadze as Elene Korisheli
- Nano Ochigava as Ketevan as a child
- Boris Tsipuria
- Akaki Khidasheli
- Leo Antadze as Levan Antadze
- Rezo Esadze
- Mzia Makhviladze as M. Makhazadze
- Amiran Amiranashvili

== Music ==
- Antonio Lauro, Venezuelan Waltz Nº1 (Tatiana): a woman is preparing cakes, while his husband reads in a newspaper that the town's mayor, Varlam Aravidze, has died.
- Khachaturian, Sabre Dance: at the end of the audience that Varlam Aravidze grants to Sandro Barateli, who complains to him that the scientific equipment housed by the regime in the old church threatens to destroy it. The audience takes place in what appears to be a hothouse, and the music blares from speakers hidden among the foliage.
- Debussy, Des pas sur la neige: Sandro Barateli plays Des pas sur la neige on the piano in his apartment before dawn on the morning of his arrest while Nino sleeps in a chair. The music accompanies Nino's dream of her and her husband fleeing through flooded underground passages and then through the streets of old Tbilisi, pursued by Varlam Aravidze, who rides in the back of an open-topped motorcar.
- Beethoven, Ode to Joy: Mikhail's wife Yelena sings the Ode to Joy while she appears to be delusional, talking to Nino of serving a great cause in building a grand society. "Ode to Joy" then starts playing as Sandro seems to be walking towards his execution and is hung from the church's rafters in chains, symbolically dressed like Jesus Christ.
- Beethoven, Moonlight Sonata: Abel Aravidze plays the Moonlight Sonata on the piano in his villa just before the confrontation with his son, Tornike, who then decides to commit suicide.
- Boney M., Sunny: just before Tornike Aravidze shoots himself with the hunting rifle he received as a present from his grandfather Varlam, some friends of Abel and Guliko Aravidze enter, carrying bottles of champagne, to celebrate the victory in court over Ketevan Barateli, and a radio blaring the song Sunny.
- Gounod, Mors et Vita: the heavenly chorale from the Mors et Vita oratorio provides the background music to the close of the film, as the little old lady, played by great Georgian actress Veriko Anjaparidze, climbs the hill, up Varlam Aravidze Street, having asked directions from Ketevan Barateli to the church that was blown up by Varlam's regime.

== Production ==
Tengiz Abuladze started to think about the film in the early 1970s. A near-fatal car accident in the early 1980s then convinced Abuladze to start shooting the film. He was encouraged by Eduard Shevardnadze who at that time was the first secretary of the Georgian Communist Party and who offered a special and uncensored slot on Georgian television for the film. During the shooting of the film the actor Gega Kobakhidze was arrested for being involved in the hijacking of Aeroflot Flight 6833. Production was temporarily halted, and was resumed several months later with Merab Ninidze replacing Kobakhidze.

== Release ==
When the film was finished in 1984 it was screened once and then shelved for three years. In 1987, with the new political climate initiated by Mikhail Gorbachev, the film was released again all over the Soviet Union and at film festivals in Western countries. Abuladze was awarded the Order of Lenin and he accompanied Gorbachev on his first official visit to New York in 1988. In 1988, Soviet authorities again, unofficially, banned the movie for its outstanding controversy.

== Reception ==
In West Germany, Repentance was broadcast by ZDF on 13 October 1987. The broadcast was received and widely seen in East Germany where the film was banned. East German television viewers reacted strongly as they saw parallels to their own regime. This reaction forced East German authorities and the East German press to react. Harald Wessel, second editor in chief of Neues Deutschland and the editor in chief of the Junge Welt, Hans-Dieter Schütt published editorials in their newspapers that tried to both denounce the film and to avoid anti-Soviet undertones. The situation was complicated by the fact that the editorials were for a film that was banned and should theoretically be unknown to East German readers.

== Awards ==
Award	Category	Nominee	Result
45th Golden Globe Awards	Best Foreign Language Film		Nominated
1987 Cannes Film Festival	Grand Prize of the Jury	Tengiz Abuladze	Won
1987 Cannes Film Festival	FIPRESCI Prize	Tengiz Abuladze	Won
1987 Cannes Film Festival	Prize of the Ecumenical Jury	Tengiz Abuladze	Won
1987 Cannes Film Festival	Golden Palm	Tengiz Abuladze	Nominated
1987 Chicago International Film Festival	Best Actor	Avtandil Makharadze	Won
Nika Awards	Best Actor	Avtandil Makharadze	Won
Nika Awards	Best Cinematographer	Mikhail Agranovich	Won
Nika Awards	Best Director	Tengiz Abuladze	Won
Nika Awards	Best Film	Tengiz Abuladze	Won
Nika Awards	Best Production Designer	Giorgi Miqeladze	Won
Nika Awards	Best Screenplay	Tengiz Abuladze, Nana Janelidze, Rezo Kveselava	Won

== See also ==
- List of submissions to the 60th Academy Awards for Best Foreign Language Film
- List of Soviet submissions for the Academy Award for Best Foreign Language Film

== Bibliography ==
- Denise Jeanne Youngblood and Josephine Woll (2001), Repentance. I.B.Tauris, ISBN 1-86064-395-7.
- Christensen, Julie (Spring 1991). "Tengiz Abuladze's Repentance and the Georgian Nationalist Cause" (PDF). Slavic Review. 50 (1): 163–175. doi:10.2307/2500608. JSTOR 2500608. S2CID 155732018. Archived from the original (PDF) on 2013-12-14.
