= Soap Life =

Soap Life is a 2012 documentary film produced by New York Production Services that chronicles the decline of daytime television dramas and the prospective future of the genre.

== Synopsis ==
The Soap opera has been a staple of American television programming for over 50 years. However, in the late 2000s a number of these daytime dramas began to face major budget cuts and cancellations. Producer Matthew D'Amato and his crew sat with actors, producers, writers, and fans in over 70 interviews to provide an insider view of the world of soap operas as told by the people who live it in an attempt to uncover the reasons behind the sudden decline of the daytime soaps.

== Production ==
Following the cancellation of many long-running soap operas in 2011, executive producer John Grossman assembled a team of filmmakers to document the events surrounding this milestone in American culture as they unfolded. The original idea for the film came from Carmen Grossman, wife of executive producer John Grossman. A long time General Hospital fan, Grossman was dismayed by the networks' sudden decisions to cancel an array of programs and recognized the need to help save the widely beloved Soap Operas.

The film was produced over a one-year period beginning in May 2011 by producer, Matthew D'Amato, and director, Sako Brockmann. The two filmmakers and their crew traveled coast to coast compiling a series of interviews with notable figures in the industry to get a sense of what was causing the sudden decline. Among those interviewed in the film are Agnes Nixon (creator of All My Children and One Life to Live), Lisa LoCicero (of General Hospital), Gary Tomlin (of Search for Tomorrow and Another World), Rick Hearst (of Guiding Light, General Hospital and The Bold and the Beautiful), Eileen Fulton (of As the World Turns), Julia Barr (of All My Children), and Jill Larson (of All My Children). In an interview with Soap Opera Digest, D'Amato describes the film as being, "About the past, present and future, but the focus is what's currently happening and where it's going. We talk about the history and some of the great stories but also what it takes to make a show, the numbers, the money, the focus groups, the networks."

The project was predominantly self-funded, but made effective use of Kickstarter to raise the money needed for post-production work and subsequent distribution.
