= The Deadly Trap =

1971 film

- French film poster
- French: La Maison sous les arbres
- Directed by: René Clément
- Written by: Daniel Boulanger; Sidney Buchman; Eleanor Perry; René Clément
- Based on: The Children are Gone (1966 novel) by Arthur Cavanaugh
- Produced by: Robert Dorfmann; Bertrand Javal
- Starring: Faye Dunaway; Frank Langella
- Cinematography: Andréas Winding
- Edited by: Françoise Javet; Christiane Lack; Jean Ravel
- Music by: Gilbert Bécaud
- Production company: Les Films Corona; Les Films Pomereu; Oceania Produzioni Internazionali Cinematografiche
- Distributed by: Les Films Corona (France); Titanus (Italy)
- Release dates: May 1971 (Cannes); 9 June 1971 (France); 14 January 1972 (Italy)
- Running time: 96 minutes
- Countries: France; Italy
- Language: English

The Deadly Trap (French: La Maison sous les arbres, lit. 'The House Under the Trees') is a 1971 psychological thriller film directed and co-written by René Clément, and starring Faye Dunaway, Frank Langella, Barbara Parkins and Raymond Gérôme.

A French-Italian co-production, the film was screened at the 1971 Cannes Film Festival before being released in France by Les Films Corona on June 9, 1971.

== Plot ==
Jill and Philip are an American couple living in Paris together with their two small children. Philip is currently an office worker, but he used to be involved with some shady organization which now wants him to do one more job for them. Meanwhile, Jill and Philip are having marital problems, which are exacerbated by Jill's mental instability—she has memory lapses and paranoid suspicions of Philip being unfaithful. The couple also has a neighbor, Cynthia, who shows an unusual interest in their affairs. One day, when Jill is out for a walk with the children, they go missing. The couple contacts the police but Inspector Chameille, who leads the investigation, is unsure whether the children were actually kidnapped or harmed by their erratic mother.

== Cast ==
- Faye Dunaway as Jill
- Frank Langella as Philip
- Barbara Parkins as Cynthia
- Karen Blanguernon as Miss Hansen
- Raymond Gérôme as Inspector Chameille
- Michèle Lourie as Cathy
- Patrick Vincent as Patrick
- Gérard Buhr as the Psychiatrist
- Maurice Ronet as the Stranger
- Jill Larson as the real Miss Hansen
- Franco Ressel as Gendarme

== Release ==
The Deadly Trap was screened at the 1971 Cannes Film Festival, but was not entered into the main competition. It was released in France on June 9, 1971.

=== Home media ===
The film was released on Blu-Ray in the United States by Kino Lorber in February 2020.

== Reception ==
The film received mixed reviews upon release. Vincent Canby in The New York Times called it an "arbitrarily muddled" suspense melodrama where "nothing works", and that it "means to demonstrate...the limits of human patience." Time Out praised "Clément's nice Hitchcockian-flavoured style and deft use of menacingly 'ordinary' locations" but said that "the ending has an impact similar to the punchline of a shaggy dog story."
