= Mamuka Kikaleishvili =

Georgian actor and film director

- Born: Mamuka Andreyevich Kikaleishvili; 10 August 1960; Tbilisi, Georgian SSR, Soviet Union
- Died: 3 May 2000 (aged 39); Moscow, Russia
- Years active: 1981-2000
- Spouse: Tatyana
- Awards: State Prize of the Azerbaijan SSR

Mamuka Kikaleishvili (Georgian: მამუკა კიკალეიშვილი, Russian: Мамука́ Андре́евич Кикалейшви́ли; 10 August 1960 – 3 May 2000 was a Georgian actor and film director.

== Biography ==
Born in Tbilisi in 1960, he graduated from Tbilisi Theatre Institute (1981) and worked for Marjanishvili National Academic Drama Theatre until 1984. In 1984, he was employed by the Georgia Film studio. Throughout his career, Mamuka Kikaleishvili performed in leading and secondary roles in a number of films produced in USSR, Russia, Georgia, Azerbaijan, Ukraine, and Uzbekistan. At the 1988 international festival in Gabrovo, Bulgaria, he won a prize for the best comedy actor. In 1992, he made his debut as a director and co-directed Fallen Angel (Georgia) with Levon Uzunian.

Later in his life, he worked for the Georgian Embassy in Moscow where he died in 2000.

On the morning of April 26, 2000, Mamuka's wife called the emergency services to report her husband unconscious. The ambulance found the actor unconscious on his bed, with an empty box of sleeping pills next to him. Doctors at the Sklifosovsky Institute fought for his life for a week, but Mamuka died of a sleeping pill overdose on May 3, 2000, in Moscow, without regaining consciousness, less than three months before his 40th birthday. He is buried in Tbilisi, at the Vaki Cemetery.

== Filmography ==
- Old Hags — Russia, 2000
- Instead of Me — Russia, 2000
- The Princess on a Bean — Ukraine, 1997
- Cafe in Lemon Russia, 1994
- Weather Is Good on Deribasovskaya, It Rains Again on Brighton Beach — Russia, 1992
- Bravo, Giordano Bruno — Georgia, 1993
- Zero Option — Uzbekistan, 1992
- Wandering Stars — USSR, 1991
- Crooks— USSR, 1990
- Passport — USSR/France, 1990
- Girl from Rouen Nicknamed Doughnut — USSR, 1989
- The Scoundrel — Azerbaijan SSR, 1988
- The Life of Don Quixote and Sancho — Georgian SSR/Spain, 1988
- Gentlemen Adventurers — Georgian SSR, 1985
- An Unusual Trip — Georgian SSR, 1983
