= The Taking of Deborah Logan =

- Theatrical release poster
- Directed by: Adam Robitel
- Written by: Gavin Heffernan; Adam Robitel
- Produced by: Jeff Rice; Bryan Singer
- Starring: Jill Larson; Anne Ramsay; Michelle Ang; Ryan Cutrona
- Cinematography: Andrew Huebscher
- Edited by: Gavin Heffernan; Adam Robitel
- Music by: Haim Mazar
- Production companies: Bad Hat Harry Productions; Jeff Rice Films; Guerin-Adler-Scott Pictures; Casadelic Pictures
- Distributed by: Eagle Films; Millennium Entertainment
- Release date: October 21, 2014
- Running time: 90 minutes
- Country: United States
- Language: English

The Taking of Deborah Logan is a 2014 American supernatural horror film, which serves as the feature film directorial debut of Adam Robitel, who co-wrote the screenplay and edited the film with Gavin Heffernan. The film stars Jill Larson, Anne Ramsay and Michelle Ang. Set in Virginia, it tells the story of a documentary crew making a film about Alzheimer's patients who uncover something sinister while documenting a woman who has the disease. The film was produced by Jeff Rice and Bryan Singer and was released on October 21, 2014.

== Plot ==
Students, Mia Hu, Gavin, and Luis start a project documenting Deborah Logan, an elderly woman with Alzheimer's disease, living with her daughter, Sarah. As they record her daily life, Deborah starts to exhibit increasingly bizarre actions, which her personal physician states are normal for someone with an aggressive form of Alzheimer's. However, cameraman, Luis, notices that her actions defy ordinary explanations, and expresses concern that something supernatural is at work.

Things grow more tense after Luis and Gavin record Deborah speaking in French about sacrifices, and snakes. They notice that the line for 337 at her switchboard continually rings; the line belonged to local physician Henri Desjardins, who disappeared after a series of cannibalistic ritualized murders of four young girls. Deborah's behavior becomes so extreme that she is hospitalized for her own safety. Dismayed, Gavin quits the film.

The others discover that Desjardins was supposedly recreating an ancient Monacan ritual to make himself immortal. The ritual required the deaths of five girls who had recently had their first period. They suspect Deborah is possessed by Desjardins. Sarah, Mia, and Luis discover that Deborah had unsuccessfully tried to abduct Cara Minetti, a young cancer patient. At the hospital, Harris Sredl, Deborah's friend, visits her, and she begs him to kill her. He tries to comply, but is knocked out by the entity possessing her.

Harris reveals to Sarah that years ago, Deborah found out that Desjardins planned to use Sarah as his fifth victim. To protect Sarah, Deborah murdered Desjardins and buried his body in the yard. The group finds the body's remains and tries to burn them, but fails when Desjardins' spirit intervenes.

Deborah escapes her restraints, abducts Cara and takes her to the abandoned mine where the previous victims were killed. Sheriff Linda Tweed pursues her, only to be killed. When Sarah and Mia find Deborah, she is trying to swallow Cara's head in a snake-like manner. They manage to burn Desjardins' corpse, and Deborah becomes herself again, the possession apparently having ceased.

Some time later, news footage shows that Deborah was deemed unfit to stand trial for her crimes, her health having deteriorated rapidly following the incident. Cara, now cancer-free, celebrates her 10th birthday. As the reporter wraps up the story, Cara smiles sinisterly, implying she is now possessed by Desjardins, who has completed the ritual.

== Cast ==
- Jill Larson as Deborah Logan
  - Lucinda Carmichael as young Deborah
- Anne Ramsay as Sarah Logan
  - Sophia Allyce Fuller as young Sarah
- Michelle Ang as Mia Hu
- Ryan Cutrona as Harris Sredl
  - Rob Springer as young Harris
- Anne Bedian as Dr. Analisa Nazir
- Brett Gentile as Gavin
- Jeremy DeCarlos as Luis
- Tonya Bludsworth as Linda Tweed
- Julianne Taylor as Cara Minetti
- Kevin A. Campbell as Henri Desjardins
- Jeffrey Woodard as Father Vitali
- David Hains as News Reporter
- Sage Cline as Hospital Security

== Production ==
The filming took place in the Charlotte metropolitan area, North Carolina and Creative Network Studios. Additional stunt doubles were used in place of Mia, Deborah and others. Vincent Guastini did the special effects. He said that he was impressed with the script and wanted to work with the filmmakers. He described his relationship with Robitel as "truly a collaborative effort." He agreed with Robitel's choice to limit the amount of footage seen of the transformation, as he felt this "added more believability and truth".

== Release ==
The Taking of Deborah Logan released via electronic sell-through on October 21, 2014 and was followed by releases on video on demand and DVD on November 4, 2014.

== Reception ==
The film holds a 92% approval rating on Rotten Tomatoes, based on reviews from 12 critics, and the average score is 6.6/10.

Ain't it Cool News called it "found footage done right... one of the most effective entries in the popular subgenre" while The Wrap named it a "Netflix Horror Gem", calling the film "one of the freshest entries in American possession horror". Nerdist and Dread Central both wrote mostly positive reviews for the film, with Dread Central commenting that while the film would not appeal to everyone, "if you're looking for a spooky little film that's free of pretension and sometimes logic and are into getting some quick shivers, you really cannot go wrong". In contrast, Bloody Disgusting panned the film, stating that it was unduly derivative of other similarly themed works to be truly effective and that other than a specific scene near the end, "the film brings nothing new to the table".
