= Jill Larson =

American actress and former model (born 1947)

- Born: October 7, 1947 (age 78); Minneapolis, Minnesota, U.S.
- Occupation: Actress
- Years active: 1971–present
- Website: jilllarson.com

Jill Larson (born October 7, 1947) is an American actress. She is best known for her role as Opal Cortlandt on the ABC daytime soap opera, All My Children (1989–2011, 2013), and as titular character in the 2014 supernatural horror film The Taking of Deborah Logan.

== Early life ==
Larson has three sisters. Larson attended the same high school as Dorothy Lyman, who played Opal on All My Children before her. She enrolled at the University of Minnesota (eventually, she finished her education at Hunter College), and began singing in nightclubs with a group called Just Us. It was not long before Just Us was discovered and headed to New York City, where they recorded several soundtracks, including the one for the film, Rachel, Rachel, starring Joanne Woodward.

== Career ==
Larson and her sister traveled throughout Europe in a bus, before she settled in Paris, France. She became a model, and was soon appearing in major American and European fashion spreads. While in Paris, she also landed her first film role (as a Swedish au pair) in Deadly Trap, starring Faye Dunaway and Frank Langella. Her next film role was as Jeanne Moreau's rival for her character's younger lover in the film, Dear Louise.

Larson made her Broadway debut in Death and the King's Horseman (1987). Other Broadway credits include Romantic Comedy by Bernard Slade and Dancing in the End Zone by Bill Davis. Her Off-Broadway credits include Mayo Simon's two-person play These Men (1980) and Terrence McNally's It's Only a Play (1982). Other regional credits include Private Lives, Full Gallop (a one-woman show portraying the famous editor of Vogue, Diana Vreeland), Holiday, The Seagull, the title roles in Agnes of God and Gypsy. In addition to performing, Larson produced the cabaret revue Serious Bizness (1983). One of her proudest accomplishments was producing and appearing in Wicked & My So Called Life - a comedy revue written by Winnie Holzman and David Babcock, which ran successfully Off-Broadway for 8 months.

In 1986, Larson made her daytime television debut as TV columnist Judith Clayton on CBS's As the World Turns. In 1988, she briefly played bomb-loving psycho Ursula Blackwell on One Life to Live before landing the role of Opal on All My Children. She received two Daytime Emmy Award for Outstanding Supporting Actress in a Drama Series nominations for her performance. In June 2006, after approximately 17 years on contract at All My Children, Larson was taken off contract and reassigned to recurring status. But in early December 2009, ABC announced that, effective immediately, Larson would go back to contract status to ensure her stay with the show through its move to LA. She returned to All My Children on the short-lived revival web series in 2013. In 2014, Larson guest starred on The Young and the Restless.

In addition to her career on the daytime television, Larson appeared in a number of films, such as White Squall (1996), Were the World Mine (2008) and Shutter Island (2010), and guest starred on Law & Order: Criminal Intent, Desperate Housewives, and CSI: Crime Scene Investigation. In 2014 she had the leading role in the horror-thriller film, The Taking of Deborah Logan. Larson received positive reviews for her performance in film. She later co-starred in horror films Can't Take It Back (2017) and The Manor (2021).

== Filmography ==
=== Film ===
Year	Title	Role	Notes
1971	The Deadly Trap	Au pair	
1972	Dear Louise		
1986	Wise Guys	Mrs. Fixer	
1996	White Squall	Peggy Beaumont	
1996	Vertical City		
2005	Barry Dingle		
2007	The Living Wake	Alma Binew	
2008	Were the World Mine	Nora Bellinger	
2008	Manhattanites	Mrs. Grimm	
2010	Shutter Island	Manacled Woman	
2012	Soap Life	Herself	Documentary film
2014	First Kiss	Kisser	Short film
2014	Red Velvet Cake	Denise	Short film
2014	The Taking of Deborah Logan	Deborah Logan	
2015	Forever	Rachel	
2016	Maya Rose	Violet	Short film
2017	Can't Take It Back	Maya Rose	
2018	The Neighborhood Watch	Mary	
2021	The Manor	Trish	
2022	A Holiday I Do	Mary Ellen McSurely	
2023	The Wrath of Becky	Darryl Sr.	

=== Television ===
Year	Title	Role	Notes
1980	The Day the Women Got Even	Paula Robinson	TV movie
1985	The Equalizer	Single Female	Episode: "Mama's Boy"
1986-1987	As the World Turns	Judith Clayton	Recurring role
1988	Kate & Allie	Felicia Brompton	Episode: "Working Women"
1988-1989	One Life to Live	Ursula Blackwell	Series regular: August 23, 1988 – 1989
1989	Santa Barbara	Garnette	Recurring role
1989-2011, 2013	All My Children	Opal Cortlandt	Series regular Nominated — Daytime Emmy Award for Outstanding Supporting Actress in a Drama Series (1991, 1993); Nominated — Soap Opera Digest Award for Best Wedding: Daytime (1992)
1990	Over the Limit	Mrs. Walsh	TV movie
2007	Law & Order: Criminal Intent	Clara Holland	Episode: "Bombshell"
2011	Desperate Housewives	Sister Marta	Episode: "Farewell Letter"
2012	CSI: Crime Scene Investigation	Lucinda Kemp	Episode: "Tressed to Kill"
2014	The Young and the Restless	Connie Ross	Recurring role
2016	Vinyl	Bellamy	Recurring role. 3 episodes
2018	Christmas on Honeysuckle Lane	Rachel Jacobs	TV movie
2020	Hunters	Frannie Fischer	Episode: "The Mourner's Kaddish"
