= Anne Bedian =

Armenian-Canadian actress

- Born: Anne Nahabedian; March 15, 1972 (age 54); Montreal, Quebec, Canada
- Education: Concordia University
- Occupation: Actress
- Years active: 1999–present

Anne Bedian or Anne Nahabedian (Armenian: Աննա Նահապետյան; born March 15, 1972) is a Canadian actress. She is known for her roles as Maria on Delta State, Dr. Nazir on The Taking of Deborah Logan, and Shara on Curb Your Enthusiasm.

== Biography ==
Bedian is of Armenian descent and speaks Armenian fluently. She also speaks English, French, German, and Spanish. Bedian is a Meisner-trained actor and has Meisner coaches in Montreal, Toronto, New York, and Los Angeles to train with where ever she is staying.

She was the youngest member to serve on board HMCS Nipigon in the Royal Canadian Navy and received a medal for serving over 180 days with NATO during her 3-year service in the Canadian Armed Forces.

== Filmography ==
Film
Year	Title	Role	Notes
1999	Ladies Room	Intella	
2000	Artificial Lies	Sarah	
2000	Cul de sac	Junkie Emily	Short
2001	Varian's War: The Forgotten Hero	Woman (uncredited)	TV movie
2001	Stiletto Dance	Vernon's Girl	TV movie
2001	Nowhere in Sight	Angel	
2003	Wall of Secrets	Bruce's Girlfriend	TV movie
2011	Three Veils	Farridah	
2014	Guardian Angel	Mona Robertson	
2014	The Taking of Deborah Logan	Nazir	
2016	The Last Inhabitant	-	

Television and web
Year	Title	Role	Notes
2004	Delta State	Maria	Recurring cast (26 episodes)
2004	The Grid	Nili Michaels	1 episodes
2004	Sue Thomas: F.B.Eye	Ali Watson	1 episodes
2007	Lost	Amira	1 episode
2008-2009	The Ex List	Marina	9 episodes
2011-2017	Curb Your Enthusiasm	Shara	2 episodes
2011	Combat Hospital	Maj. Hasti Samizay / Major Hasti Samizay	6 episodes
2016	Criminal Minds: Beyond Borders	Rabia Bayar	1 episode
