= The Living Wake =

2007 film

- Theatrical poster
- Directed by: Sol Tryon
- Written by: Peter Kline; Mike O'Connell
- Produced by: Ami Ankin; Chadwick Clough; Peter Kline; Mike O'Connell; Sol Tryon
- Starring: Mike O'Connell; Jesse Eisenberg; Jim Gaffigan
- Edited by: Joe Klotz
- Distributed by: Axiom Films (UK and Ireland) Mangusta (domestic)
- Release date: 2007
- Language: English

The Living Wake (2007) is a dark comedic film written by Mike O'Connell and Peter Kline and produced by Ami Ankin. A directorial debut by Sol Tryon, the film stars Mike O'Connell, Jesse Eisenberg, and Jim Gaffigan.

== Plot ==
The film follows the journey of K. Roth Binew, a self-proclaimed genius. After discovering that he has contracted a rare and unnamed terminal disease, he enlists his eccentric rickshaw-riding best and only friend Mills Joaquin (Jesse Eisenberg) to accompany him on his last day to live. Throughout the film, he attempts to find the meaning of life in "a brief, but powerful monologue" that his eccentric father had promised to tell him, but abandoned K. Roth before he could.

K. Roth's final day begins with a confrontation with his neighbor and rival, Reginald, whom he invites to his living wake. With his friend Mills, he attempts to make his funeral arrangements, visits a "liquorsmith", and makes a goat sacrifice in order to appease Greek gods. Believing that love is the meaning of life, K. Roth has a picnic with his former nanny, Marla, whom he describes as his true love. This fails, and after a brief romp with a prostitute (Colombe Jacobsen), whom he also invites to his wake, K. Roth and Mills journey to the public library, where he tries to donate his entire works. When his books are deemed to be unfit for reading, K. Roth visits a psychic in another attempt to find the meaning of life.

With his wake and death looming, K. Roth falls into a depression. He is revived when he chances upon a church, the members of which encourage him to reconnect with his family. His brother, Karl, and mother (Jill Larson) are reluctant to reconcile with him, and do not believe that he is dying. Karl states that K is neither a writer or an inventor except in his own ego and is a delusional man, he calls the family doctor. After having a last drink at a bar, K. Roth and Mills prepare for the wake.

The wake begins, with the entire film's cast in attendance. The wake is made up of dancing by K. Roth, a song performed by Mills called "If I Was Real", and a one-woman play performed by K. Roth called "Remembrance of Dawn". K. Roth's wake is interrupted by the arrival of his mother, Karl, and the family doctor, Dr. Schoenberg. They plead with him to stop the wake, describing it as another of his "episodes". K. Roth refuses, and the wake continues with K. Roth tying up loose ends, including revenge on his neighbor, Reginald, and the giving away of his possessions. Mills recites a poem about K. Roth.

The wake is again interrupted by the arrival of the ghost of Lampert Binew (Jim Gaffigan), K. Roth's father. Though only K. Roth can see him, K. Roth proceeds to confront him in front of the audience about his abandonment. Lampert explains to him that he never abandoned him, and had simply died without leaving any trace. He tells K. Roth that there is no "equation for life", and therefore no monologue, and that the meaning of life was merely to live to your full potential. With his time drawing near, K. Roth has a moment of self-awareness, stating that his life was meaningless, and that he was a "stupid, drunk, scared, dying man". With encouragement from his father, K. Roth concludes his wake with a song and dance. With the last words of the song, K. Roth's disease takes effect, and he collapses into an upright coffin. He is proclaimed dead. The members of the wake pay their final respects. A mourning Mills takes K. Roth's body to a pond, where he sets it ablaze as the film draws to a close.

== Cast ==
- Mike O'Connell as K. Roth Binew
- Jesse Eisenberg as Mills Joaquin, best and only friend of K. Roth Binew
- Jim Gaffigan as Lampert Binew, K. Roth Binew's father
- Ann Dowd as the Librarian
- Eddie Pepitone as Reginald
- Jill Larson as Alma Binew
- Colombe Jacobsen as Prostitute
- Clay Allen as Moustache Man
- Ami Ankin as Mother
- Harlan Baker as Dr. Schoenberg
- Bryan Brown as Frank
- Rebecca Comerford as Gypsy Psychic
- Matthew Cowles as Mossman
- Allen Valcourt as Reginald's son

== Release ==
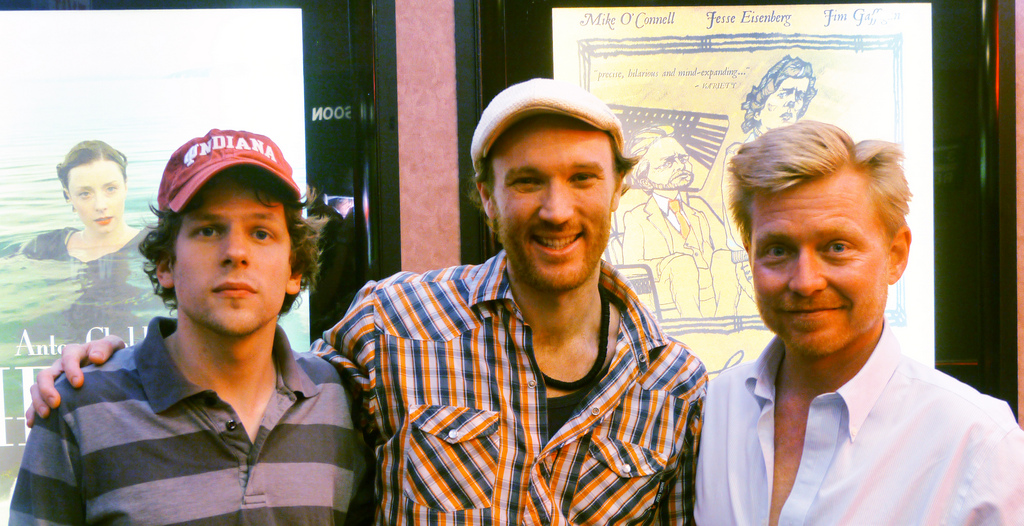
Jesse Eisenberg, Sol Tryon & Mike O'Connell at the 2010 release

A Mangusta Productions film, The Living Wake was completed in 2007 and shown at several film festivals around the states before being theatrically released in May 2010. In January 2011, Hulu began streaming The Living Wake.

== Reception ==
The film holds a 50% rating on Rotten Tomatoes, based on 17 reviews.

=== Awards ===
The film won the Comedic Vision Award at the Austin Film Festival in 2007 and the Audience Award for Narrative Feature at the Woodstock Film Festival in 2007. It was the Official Selections for AFI Los Angeles in 2007, Marfa Film Festival, Gen Art Chicago Film Festival and Off Camera Film Festival in Kraków, Poland. It has also won the Best Feature Film Award in 2008 at the Big Apple Film Festival.

In 2008, Jesse Eisenberg also won the Rising Star Award at the Vail Film Festival.
