= The Rope =

French 2022 TV drama miniseries

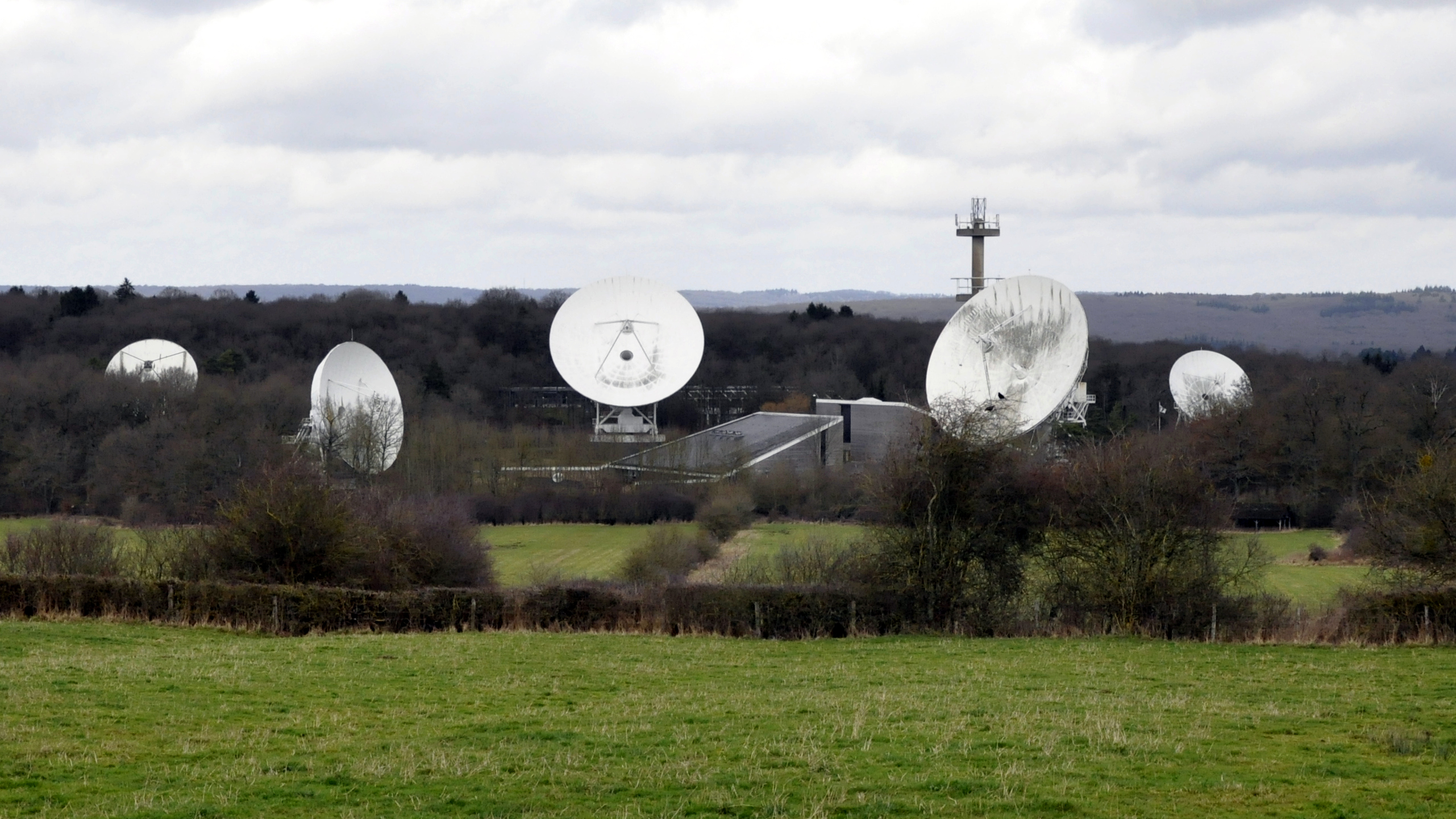
- The series was filmed at the former Lessive Space Telecommunications Earth Station in Belgium
- Genre: Drama, Mystery
- Created by: Dominique Rocher; Éric Forestier
- Based on: La Corde by Stefan Aus dem Siepen
- Screenplay by: Eric Forestier; Dominique Rocher
- Directed by: Dominique Rocher
- Starring: Suzanne Clément; Jeanne Balibar; Jean-Marc Barr; Christa Théret; Richard Sammel; Jakob Cedergren
- Music by: Grégoire Hetzel
- Country of origin: France
- No. of episodes: 3

Production
- Producers: Carine Boyé; Pierre Garnier
- Cinematography: Jordane Chouzenoux
- Editor: Isabelle Manquillet
- Running time: 156 minutes (52 min each)

Original release
- Network: Arte
- Release: 28 December 2021

The Rope (French: La Corde) is a French drama miniseries created by Dominique Rocher, and Éric Forestier. The story follows a group of scientists at a remote Norwegian ground station who find a mysterious rope nearby in the woods.

== Plot ==
At a remote ground station somewhere in northern Norway, renowned scientists Bernhardt Mueller and his wife Agnès are leading a team to research FRBs. They hope to receive authorization soon to implement a protocol on which they have been working for fifteen years. When the approval is given the celebrations are interrupted by a weird discovery. Some of the team members find a seemingly endless rope that suddenly appears at the edge of the forest. Bernhardt decides to lead a group of six which include Sophie, Serge, Leila, Joseph and Dani to follow the rope. Bernhardt eventually becomes hesitant and chooses to go back to the station. Along the way back though, he falls down a steep cliff and is killed. As the remaining five continue following the rope, concern for their well-being has set in back at the station. While Agnès worries about her husband, she takes advantage of his absence to spend time with her secret lover Ulrik.

Eventually a rescue team is formed to search the area which turns up no results. While following the rope far ahead Sophie has a healing vision, and Leila is entranced by the rope which gives both of them determination to follow the rope to the end. The remaining five members eventually find the bodies of previous followers. Dani has a vision that night of a talking corpse who tells her they had a disagreement that turned violent about whether to continue or not. In frustration she tries to cut the rope the following morning but is killed by Sophie before doing so. Leila sneaks off the morning after to follow the rope on her own which leads her husband Joseph to search for her. Serge is left alone with Sophie where he kills her in a murderous rage. Back at the station the time soon comes to experiment with the protocol. The police have given up all hope of finding the missing team members having searched for 3 weeks. (Note: 4 or 5 days have passed for the missing team members.)

Agnès refuses to face the reality of her loss while concurrently her experimental protocol ends in failure. When Ulrik understands why their scientific experiment failed, she regains hope and decides to find Bernhardt herself by following the rope. She eventually finds his remains and is given peace knowing she can finally move on and be with Ulrik. Agnès decides to retire from the field of Astronomy after her protocol is a success. When she goes to Ulrik though, he informs her that he had waited long enough for her. Meanwhile, far down the rope the remaining two survivors Leila and Joseph find each other in a vast desert. The two reconcile then argue the following day after Joseph doesn't recognize her. Joseph ends up killing his wife and continues to follow the rope until it is revealed to the audience that it intersects with another rope.

== Cast ==
- Suzanne Clément as Agnès Mueller
- Jean-Marc Barr as Serge Morel
- Christa Théret as Leïla
- Tom Mercier as Joseph
- Richard Sammel as Bernhardt Mueller
- Jakob Cedergren as Ulrik
- Planitia Kenese as Dani Johannes
- Jeanne Balibar as Sophie Rauk
- Gilles Vandeweerd as Liam
- Isabelle de Hertogh as Hélène

== Production ==
While The Rope was directed by Dominique Rocher, it was originally based on a German novel by Stefan aus dem Siepen. The original novel is set in the 19th century and involves farmers from a village. Co-creator Éric Forestier noted that the story was handled in a "very binary way" with the men following the rope while the women stayed at the village. He stated that while the book "obviously has qualities", he wanted to give the story a modern retelling. The series was greenlit, and was eventually produced by Les Films de l'Instant in co-production with Arte France and Versus Production.

Scenes involving the "remote" Norwegian ground station were shot at the former Lessive Space Telecommunications Earth Station (now called "Le Jardin des Paraboles") in the village of Han-sur-Lesse, Belgium. Additional scenes were also shot in the nearby village of Havrenne with permission from the municipality. The café used towards the end of the series is located in the Belgian city of Namur which was meant to be Oslo Norway for the story. Filming of the series as a whole took place in France, Belgium, and Morocco from October 14 to November 27, 2020.

== Reception ==
Dorothée Barba from Radio France compared the series to The Blair Witch Project by saying the audience should know that things will go wrong. She also echoed the content warning at the start of each episode "This program has scenes not recommended for young or sensitive audiences." Oliver Armknecht from film-rezensionen.de said that while the story was familiar to German audiences, the adaptation of the novel involving space exploration adds a "charming parallel". Armknecht gave the series a 7/10 rating by saying the series has no clear answer to the rope mystery, and requires the audience to think about all this for themselves.
