= Homayoun Ershadi =

Iranian actor (1947–2025)

- همایون ارشادی
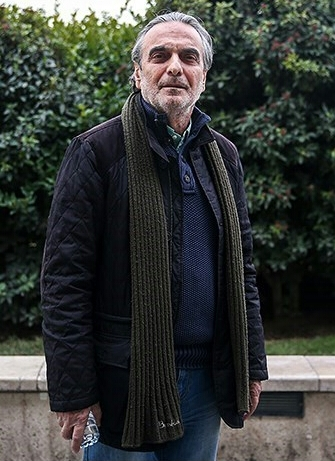
- Ershadi in 2015
- Born: 26 March 1947; Isfahan, Iran
- Died: 11 November 2025 (aged 78); Iran
- Resting place: Behesht-e Sakineh
- Education: Ca' Foscari University of Venice
- Occupation: Actor
- Years active: 1995–2025
- Children: 2

Homayoun Ershadi (alternatively spelled Homayon Ershadi, Persian: همایون ارشادی; 26 March 1947 – 11 November 2025) was an Iranian actor. He was known for his debut role in Taste of Cherry (1997), and several subsequent Iranian and other films, including European films like Agora or Hollywood films like The Kite Runner and Zero Dark Thirty.

== Early life and education ==
Homayoun Ershadi was born in Isfahan on 26 March 1947, and spent his adolescence in Karaj and Abadan. He moved to Italy to study architecture at the Ca' Foscari University of Venice in Venice, graduating in 1970.

Ershadi initially worked in Iran as an architect, but relocated to Canada with his wife following the Iranian Revolution. He and his wife settled in Vancouver, British Columbia, where he continued work as an architect. Ershadi returned to Iran in 1990 after he and his wife filed for divorce.

== Career ==
Following Ershadi's return to Iran, he settled in Tehran. Ershadi was discovered by director Abbas Kiarostami, while sitting in his car in traffic. Kiarostami approached him and requested him to play the leading role of his film, Taste of Cherry.

In 2007, he was cast in The Kite Runner, a film about two young boys growing up in Afghanistan.

== Personal life and death ==
Ershadi's two children live in Vancouver, a place he visited often to see his grandchildren.

Ershadi died from cancer in Iran on 11 November 2025, at the age of 78. He was buried at the Behesht-e Sakineh in Karaj.

== Awards ==
Ershadi won the Sepanta Awards in 2017 for "Best Actor for Short Film" for his work in Blue Lantern, from the 10th Annual Iranian Film Festival in San Francisco, California.

== Cultural reference ==
The short story "Seeing Ershadi" by Nicole Krauss was published in The New Yorker on 5 March 2018. It is about a ballet dancer who watches a film featuring Ershadi and then becomes obsessed with his face.

== Filmography ==
Year	Title	Role	Director	Ref.
1997	Taste of Cherry	Mr Badii	Abbas Kiarostami	
1998	The Pear Tree		Dariush Mehrjui	
2002	Disturbant		Sirus Alvand	
2005	Portrait of a Lady Far Away		Ali Mosaffa	
2006	Color of Friend	Mr Jahangir	Bita Shafipour	
2007	The Kite Runner	Baba	Marc Forster	
2008	Aal		Bahram Bahramian	
2009	Agora	Aspasius	Alejandro Amenábar	
2011	Facing Mirrors	Pedar	Negar Azarbayjani	
2012	Zero Dark Thirty	Hassan Ghul	Kathryn Bigelow	
2013	Good to Be Back	Merati	Dariush Mehrjui	
2014	A Most Wanted Man	Faisal Abdullah	Anton Corbijn	
2014	Ghosts		Dariush Mehrjui	
2015	Utopia		Hassan Nazer	
2016	Ali and Nino		Asif Kapadia	
2016	Blue Lantern		Reza Yarkhalaji	
2016	The Last Inhabitant	Ibrahim	Jivan Avetisyan	
2017	Lina	father	Ramin Rasouli	
2019–2020	Mannequin	Jamshid	Hossein Soheilizadeh	
2020	No Choice		Reza Dormishian	
2022	The Town		Ali Hazrati	
