= List of Azerbaijani films of the 1990s =

A list of earliest films produced in Azerbaijan ordered by year of release in the 1990s:

== 1990s ==
Title	Director	Cast	Genre	Notes
1990
Gatl Gunu; The Execution Day				
1991
Bakht Uzuyu; The Engagement Ring	Ramiz Azizbeyli	Afag Bashirgyzy; Valeh Karimov; Rafael Dadashov; Firangiz Rahimbeyova	Comedy	
1992
Etiraf; A Confession	Shamil Aliyev	Elshan Rustamov		
1994
Yarasa; The Bat	Ayaz Salayev	Rasim Balayev		
1995
Yuk; The Load				
1996
Ozge Vakht; At Other Times				
1997
Her Shey Yakhshylygha Doghru; Everything Towards The Better				
1998
Sari Gelin				
1999
Ne Gozeldir Bu Dunya; What a Wonderful World				
