= The Last Inhabitant =

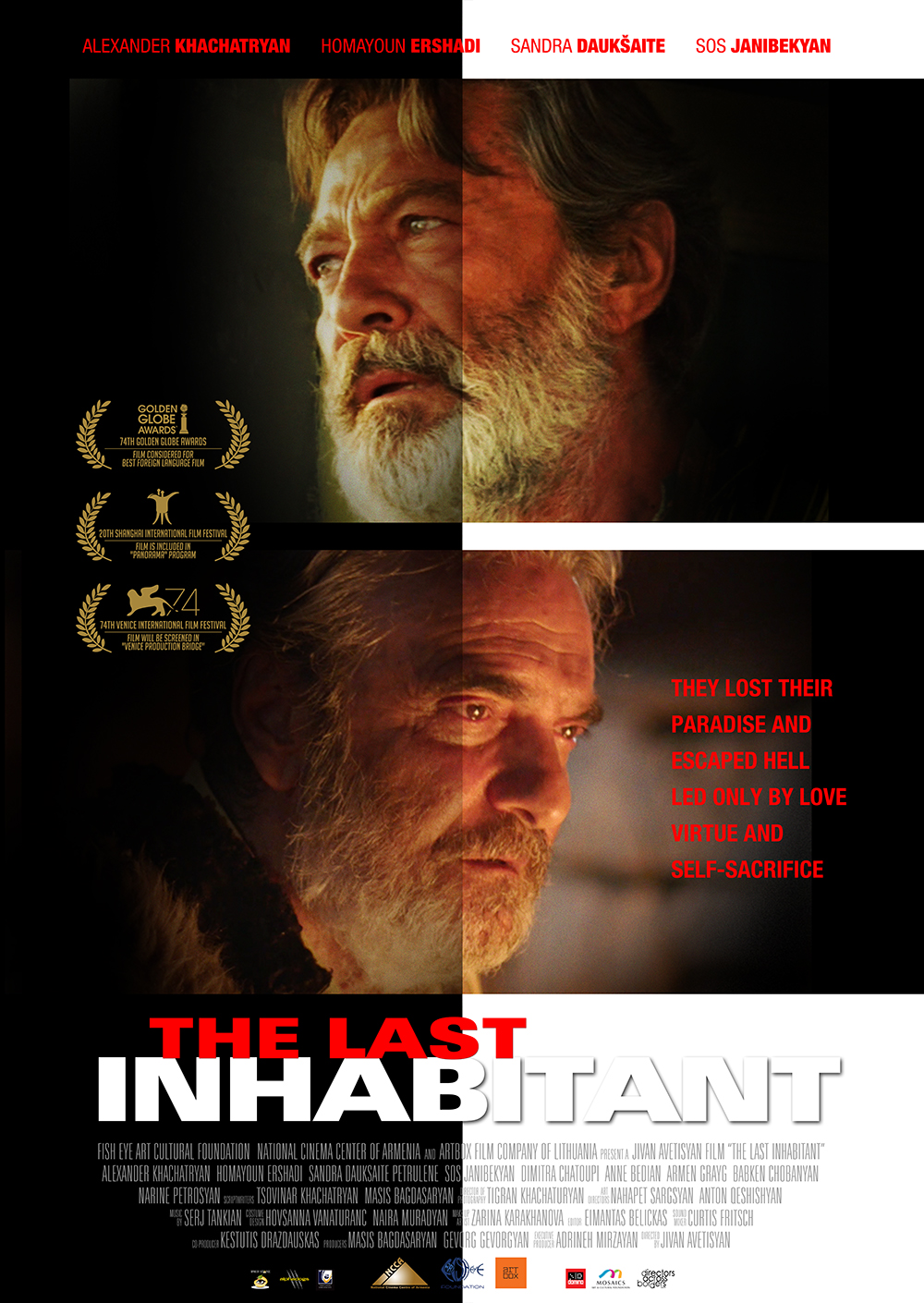
- Armenian: Վերջին բնակիչ
- Directed by: Jivan Avetisyan
- Written by: Masis Baghdasaryan, Tsovinar Khachatryan
- Produced by: Masis Baghdasaryan; Gevorg Gevorgyan; Kestutis Drazdauskas
- Starring: Alexander Khachatryan; Homayoun Ershadi; Sandra Daukšaitė-Petrulėnė; Sos Janibekyan
- Cinematography: Tigran Khachaturyan
- Edited by: Eimantas Belickas
- Music by: Serj Tankian
- Release date: 2016
- Running time: 82 minutes
- Countries: Armenia, Lithuania, Sweden, Lebanon, US
- Languages: Armenian; Azerbaijani; Russian

The Last Inhabitant (Armenian: Վերջին բնակիչը, romanized: Verjin bnakich’y) is a film directed by Jivan Avetisyan, based on the story "Last Inhabitant of Gurjevan" by Tsovinar Khachatryan.

== Plot ==
The film is set in 1988, just before the dissolution of the Soviet Union. Evicted as a result of the Armenian-Azerbaijani conflict, Abgar stays behind alone inside a gradually shrinking enemy ring. He is waiting for his daughter, who has become a witness to her husband's murder by an angry mob and was hospitalized with trauma. Ibrahim, an Azerbaijani, suggests that Abgar work on the construction of a mosque with the promise to find and return Abgar's missing daughter. A few days later, Ibrahim finds the girl, named Yurga, in a psychiatric hospital of Baku and brings her to Abgar.

== Cast ==
- Alexander Khachatryan (Armenia) as Abgar
- Homayoun Ershadi (Iran) as Ibrahim
- Sandra Dauksaite-Petrulene (Lithuania) as Yurga,
- Sos Janibekyan (Armenia) as Artist
- Dimitra Chatoupi (Greece) as Asli
- Anne Bedian (United States) as Rebecca
- Armen Grayg (Russia) as Commandant
- Babken Chobanyan (Armenia) as Razmik
- Narine Petrosyan (Armenia) as Operator
- Elfik Zohrabyan (Armenia) as Russian Soldier

== Production ==
Production took place in the village of Khachmach, Artsakh. The film was completed in 2016 as a result of an international production between “Fish еye Art” Cultural Foundation, National Cinema Center of Armenia and the Lithuanian production house “Artbox”. The film making was supported by Apricot Stone of Sweden, “Alpha Dogs, Inc” and “Mosaics Art & Cultural Foundation” both of the United States, as well as the Lebanese University Institute of Fine Arts 2 of Lebanon. The cast included actors from Iran, Lithuania, Greece, Russia and the United States.

== Filmmakers ==
- Director - Jivan Avetisyan (Armenia)
- Scriptwriters - Tsovinar Khachatryan (Armenia), Masis Baghdasaryan (Armenia)
- Producer - Masis Baghdasaryan (Armenia)
- Co–Producers - Gevorg Gevorgyan (Armenia), Kestutis Drazdauskas (Lithuania)
- Executive Producer - Adrineh Mirzayan (United States)
- Editing Director - Eimantas Belickas (Lithuania)
- Make up Artist - Zarina Karakhanova (Armenia)
- Costumes Designer - Hovsanna Vanaturanc (Armenia), Naira Muradyan (Armenia)
- Sound - Curtis Fritsch (Lithuania)
- Production Designers - Nahapes Sargsyan (Armenia), Anton Keshishyan (Armenia)
- Director of Photography - Tigran Khachaturyan (Armenia)
- Music - Serj Tankian (United States)

== Premieres and Screenings ==
The film opened in Armenia on November 17, 2016, at three main theaters including, CinemaStar, KinoPark and Moscow Cinema. In Stepanakert, the premiere of the film was on February 2, 2017, at Vallex Garden Cinema.

The Los Angeles premiere took place on April 7 at the Alex Theatre in Glendale, California. The screening was presented by the Artskah Arts and Cultural Foundation.

== Festivals and awards ==
The Last Inhabitant was considered for the 2017 Golden Globe Awards.

In Armenia, the film's premiere was on July 12, 2016, during the 13th Golden Apricot International Film Festival at Moscow Cinema.

In June 2017 in Shanghai (China) at the 20th Shanghai International Film Festival the film was screened as part of the Panorama Program.

It was screened in “Venice Production Bridge” in September 2017 in Venice (Italy) at the 74th Venice International Film Festival.

In October 2017 in Helsinki (Finland) at the Scandinavian International Film Festival, the film won the "Best Feature" Award and actor Alexander Khachatryan won an award for "Best Actor".

| N. | Year | Month/Day | Country/City | Festival | Award/ Note |
|---|---|---|---|---|---|
| 1. | 2017 | November 27 – December 3 | Italy, Padua | Dessaran Festival | Film-Screening |
| 2. | 2017 | November 15 – 19 | Canada, Toronto | Pomegranate Film Festival | Award “Honorable Mention” in the “Best Feature Film” nomination |
| 3. | 2017 | October 25 – 28 | Finland, Helsinki | Scandinavian International Film Festival | Awards “Best Feature”, Best Actor- Alexander Khachatryan” |
| 4. | 2017 | September 5 | Italy, Venice | 74th Venice International Film Festival | Screened in “Venice Production Bridge” |
| 5. | 2017 | June 17 – 26 | China, Shanghai | 20th Shanghai International Film Festival | Screened in "Panorama" Program |
| 6. | 2017 | January 8 | USA, California | 74th Golden Globe Awards | Considered for “Best Foreign Language Film” |
| 7. | 2016 | May 11 – 23 | France, Cannes | 69th Cannes International Film Festival Film Market | Negotiations for the distribution of the film "The Last Inhabitant" |

== Music ==
System of a Down rock group's vocalist Serj Tankian composed the music. The music was recorded with the participation of the Armenian Philharmonic Orchestra under artistic director and Principal Conductor Eduard Topchyan and Hover Chamber Choir under Artistic Director Sona Hovhannisyan
