= Mikheil Kalatozishvili (born 1959) =

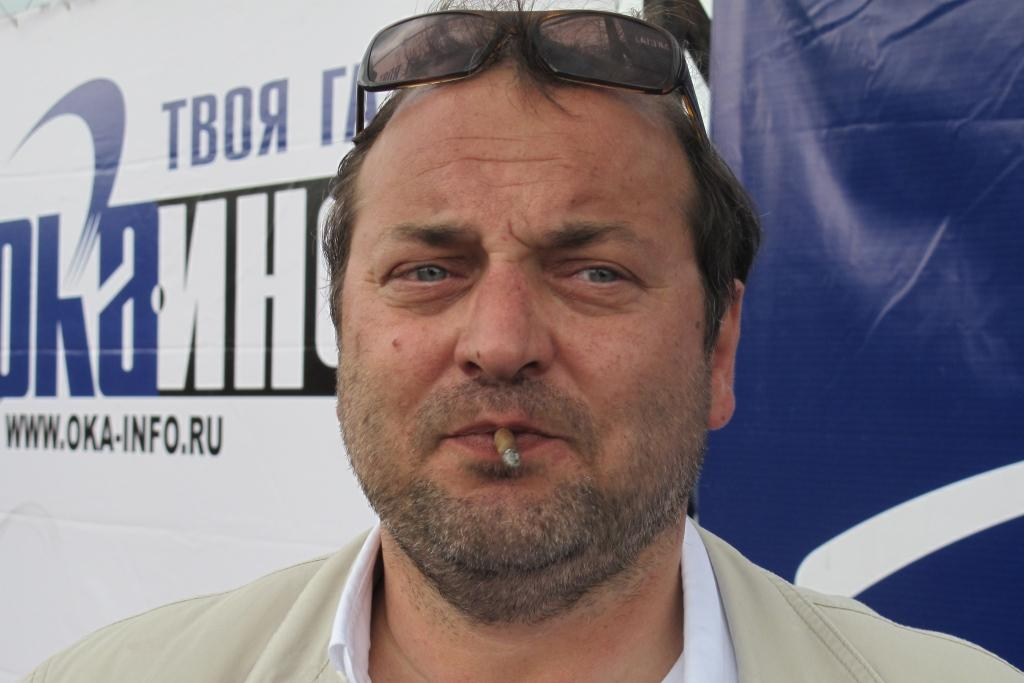
- Born: 19 May 1959; Tbilisi, Georgian SSR
- Died: 12 October 2009 (aged 50); Moscow, Russia
- Occupation(s): Film director, producer, screenwriter

Mikheil Kalatozishvili (Georgian: მიხეილ კალატოზიშვილი; Russian: Михаил Георгиевич Калатозишвили; 19 May 1959 – 12 October 2009) was a Georgian-Russian film director, producer, and screenwriter active since the early 1980s. His 1991 film The Beloved was entered into the 42nd Berlin International Film Festival. His grandfather was the world famous Soviet filmmaker of the same name, often known as Mikhail Kalatozov. Like his grandfather, Kalatozishvili was born in Tbilisi and died in Moscow, also of a heart attack.

== Filmography ==
- 1981 Mekhanik
- 1985 Scapin's Schemings
- 1991 The Beloved
- 2000 Mysteries
- 2006 A Film about Mikhail Kalatozov
- 2008 Wild Field
