= Basti Jafarova =

Azerbaijani actress (born 1959)

Basti Jafarova Bəsti Cəfərova
- Born: June 13, 1959 (age 67); Baku, Azerbaijan SSR, USSR
- Occupation: actress

Basti Ali gizi Jafarova (Azerbaijani: Bəsti Əli qızı Cəfərova, born June 13, 1959) is an Azerbaijani actress, People's Artiste of Azerbaijan (1998), professor of Azerbaijan State University of Culture and Arts (2013).

== Biography ==
Basti Jafarova was born on June 13, 1959, in Baku. In 1976, she entered the drama and film acting faculty of the Azerbaijan State Art Institute. Basti Jafarova, who studied in the course of Adil Isgandarov, completed her higher education in 1980. By appointment, she was sent to the Azerbaijan State Academic National Drama Theatre and was taken to the acting troupe.

In 2013, she was awarded the academic rank of professor at the Azerbaijan State University of Culture and Arts, where she was engaged in pedagogical activities.

== Awards ==
- Honored Artist of the Azerbaijan SSR — 1989
- People's Artiste of Azerbaijan — 1998
- Presidential Prize — April 30, 2014
- Personal Pension of the President of Azerbaijan — May 6, 2016
- Jafar Jabbarly Award — October 28, 2019
- Honorary Diploma of the President of Azerbaijan — October 29, 2019
