= Roman Musheghyan =

Armenian and Russian film-director (born 1980)

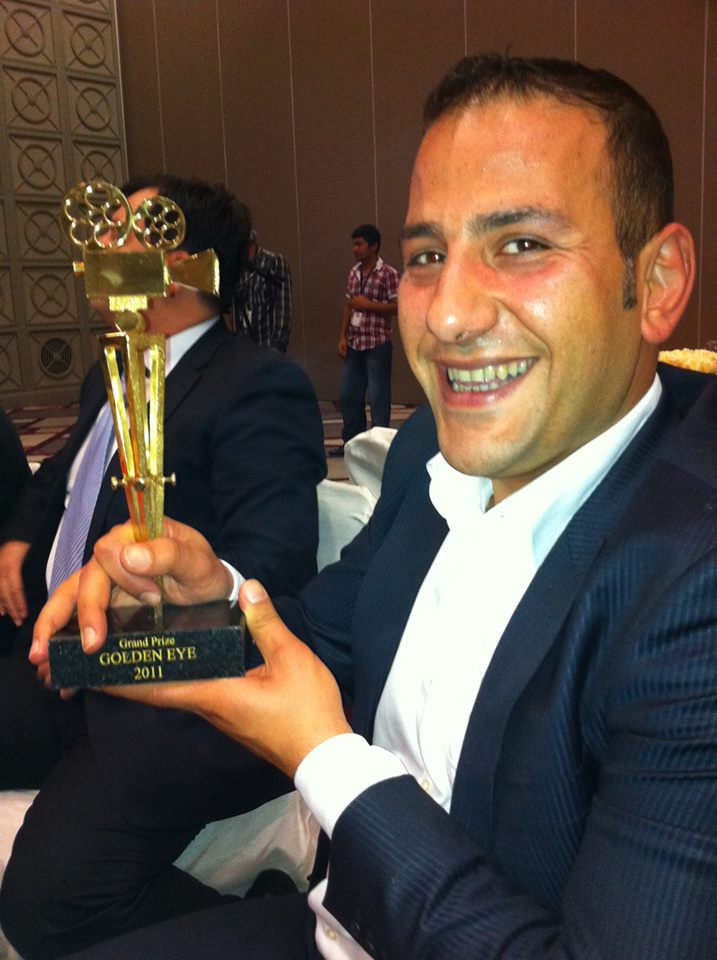
- Roman Musheghyan on Golden Eye ceremony
- Born: 13 November 1980 (age 45); Yerevan, Armenia
- Occupations: Movie director (criminal, drama and action movies)
- Years active: 1998–present

Roman Musheghyan (Armenian: Ռոման Մուշեղյան born 13 November 1980) is an Armenian and Russian film-director. He gained a wide popularity due to the TV series Trap which was broadcast in the director's homeland and then was bought to be shown on Russian television.

== Biography ==
Roman Musheghyan was born in Yerevan, the capital of Armenian SSR. He's been into different types of art since childhood. He professionally went in for national dances. The love for literature awakened a desire within him to write. He's an author of a series of poems and stories. He became interested in cinematography at the age of 14, when by chance he got acquainted with the famous Armenian film-director Frunze Dovlatyan, who noticed a potential of a future film-director in him.

In 1997 he entered the faculty of culture of Armenian State Pedagogical University after Khachatur Abovyan on the specialty of filmmaking in the studio of Frunze Dovlatyan. He spent his student years in a very difficult period for the Armenian film-industry. After the collapse of the USSR the filmmaking was almost completely suspended. In 1998 he directed his first short film Sit down, please, which was awarded "Ikar" (Armenia) for the best film. In 1999 he directed his first documentary film about human solitude, A portrait from an old family album. His diploma thesis Procession wends its way to hell, directed in 2002, received several awards: in the festival "Debut" for the best direction, a special prize at the Armenian Cinematographers' and Film Journalists' Association, "Golden Dolphine" (Armenia) for the best film. The work was also presented at the Berlin International Film Festival (Germany) in 2003 and at the Potsdam festival Sehsüchte (Germany). In 2004 it was awarded a prize for the best film at the festival "Oscariada" (Poland).

From 2002 to 2004 he served in the army of RA. He directed a series of military-themed documentary films, commissioned by the Ministry of Defence of Armenia.

In 2005 he was employed by the TV channel Shant. The head of the TV channel trusted the director the filming of the first comedy TV-series in the history of the Armenian television - A Family Upside Down. From 2007 to 2009 he directed the television series Trap 1, Trap 2, and Trap 3 (drama, a gangster saga). It became the highest rated project on the Armenian television. The Russian film production "Central Partnership" purchased the license on the production of the thriller TV series. While working at Shant TV he directed the TV series Inheritors and Lucky man.

In 2010 he directed the TV series Beyond for Armenia TV. By order of the Russian producer company "Bergsound" two detective films were directed: Million-dollar murder in 2012 and Pay off in 2013. He is a frequent guest and a jury member at local and international film festivals, held in the region.

== Filmography ==
- 2007 – Trap (TV Series)
- 2010 – The Police: Beyond (TV Series)
- 2012 – Million Dollar Murder
- 2013 – Pay Off
- 2014 – The Dead Forest
- 2015 – The Hotel
