= Rahib Aliyev =

Azerbaijani actor (1945–2024)

- Rahib Əliyev
- Born: July 12, 1945; Baku, Azerbaijan SSR, USSR
- Died: March 28, 2024 (aged 78); Baku, Azerbaijan
- Education: Azerbaijan State University of Culture and Arts
- Occupation: Actor
- Years active: 1959–2024

Rahib Seyidaga oglu Aliyev (Azerbaijani: Rahib Seyidağa oğlu Əliyev; July 12, 1945 – March 28, 2024) was an Azerbaijani stage and film actor, Honored Artist of Azerbaijan (2006).

== Biography ==
Rahib Aliyev was born on July 12, 1945, in Baku. From an early age, he performed in folk theaters; in the late 1950s, he became an actor in theater groups, where he played many roles. From 1965 to 1969, he studied at the Faculty of Acting of Drama-cinema of the Azerbaijan State Theater Institute, named after M.A. Aliyev (now Azerbaijan State University of Culture and Arts). During his studies at the institute, in 1967, he was invited to the Azerbaijan State Theatre of Young Spectators named after M. Gorky, where he worked for the rest of his life. Rahib Aliyev officially began his acting career on September 18, 1968. From 1968 on, playing on the professional stage, he continued his acting career. Rahib Aliyev played more than 70 roles on the stage of the Theater of Young Spectators. Aliyev died on March 28, 2024, at the age of 78.

== Awards ==
In 2006 he was awarded the honorary title of "Honored Artist of the Republic of Azerbaijan" for his contribution to the development of theatre art of Azerbaijan. He was also awarded the Presidential Award in 2011, 2013, 2014, 2015, 2016, 2017 and 2018. On March 10, 2015, he was awarded the medal of "Skillful master" (Azerbaijani: "Sənətkar") established by the Union of Theater Workers of Azerbaijan. On December 10, 2018, he was awarded the Taraggi Medal in connection with the 90th anniversary of the Azerbaijan State Theatre of Young Spectators and for his contributions.

== Filmography ==
- The Stars Do Not Go Out (1971)
- I Want To Understand (1980)
- Road Story (1980)
- The Scoundrel (1988)
- Live, Golden Fish (1988)
- The Day of the Murder (1990)
- The Scream (1993)
- The Dog (1994)
- What a Beautiful World... (1999)
- Execution Is Delayed!... (2002)
- The Truth of the Moment (2003)
- New Life (2005)
- Inspection (2006)
- We Will Return (2007)
- Life of a Javid (2007)
- Distinguished (2008)
- Man (2010)
- Story of Court Advocates (2011)
- The Last Stop (2014)
