= Haji Ismayilov =

Azerbaijani actor

Haji Ismayilov Hacı İsmayılov
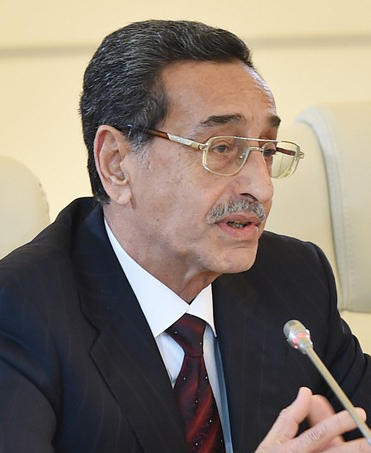
- Born: January 22, 1944 (age 81); Baku, Azerbaijan SSR, USSR
- Education: Azerbaijan State Theater Institute
- Occupation: Actor
- Years active: 1967–present
- Awards

Haji Majid oghlu Ismayilov (Azerbaijani: Hacı Məcid oğlu İsmayılov, born January 22, 1944) is an Azerbaijani theatre and film actor, People's Artiste of Azerbaijan (2000), vice-chairman for creativity of the Union of Theater Workers of Azerbaijan (2014), and acting chairman of the Union temporarily (2023).

== Biography ==
Haji Ismayilov was born on January 22, 1944 in Baku. In 1963, he entered the drama and film acting faculty of the Azerbaijan State Theater Institute named after Mirzagha Aliyev. He was invited to work as an actor at the Sumgayit State Musical Drama Theater and started working in the youth troupe on September 2, 1968. He has been working at the Azerbaijan State Academic National Drama Theatre since February 16, 1970.

For the first time in "Azerbaijanfilm" film studio, he played the role of Mustafa in the movie "Birthday". He achieved great success with this role, and on April 22, 1980 he was awarded the title of laureate of the State Prize of the Azerbaijan SSR.

Since 2014, he has acted as the vice chairman for creativity of the Union of Theater Workers of Azerbaijan. From 2023, he has been the acting chairman of the Union.

== Awards ==
- People's Artiste of Azerbaijan — December 18, 2000
- Honored Artist of the Azerbaijan SSR — May 17, 1989
- Shohrat Order — January 21, 2019
- State Prize of the Azerbaijan SSR – April 22, 1980
