= Alexander Lapshin =

Russian-Israeli travel-blogger and journalist

- אלכסנדר לפשין
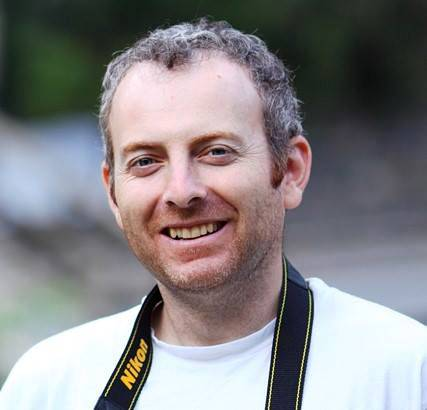
- Born: February 4, 1976 (age 50); Sverdlovsk, Russian SFSR, Soviet Union
- Education: University of Haifa, University of Maryland
- Occupations: Blogger, journalist
- Children: 1
- Website: puerrtto.livejournal.com

Alexander Valerievich Lapshin (Hebrew: אלכסנדר לפשין, Russian: Александр Валерьевич Лапшин; born February 4, 1976) is a Soviet-born travel blogger and journalist. Lapshin holds Ukrainian and Russian citizenships. In 2016, Lapshin was arrested in Minsk at the request of the Azerbaijani authorities and extradited to Baku due to a visit to Nagorno-Karabakh. On May 20, 2021, the European Court of Human Rights in Strasbourg ruled on the blogger's complaint against the Republic of Azerbaijan, finding the country's authorities responsible for the illegal arrest, torture and attempted murder of Lapshin.

== Biography ==
Alexander Lapshin was born in 1976 in Sverdlovsk (now Yekaterinburg) to a Russian father and Jewish-Ukrainian mother. He studied in the United States for about a year. Between 2003 and 2008, he lived in Moscow and was engaged in commercial real estate and the Forex market. After the 2008 financial crisis, he moved to Germany. Until 2016, he lived in Berlin, working as a remote editor of Russian travel Internet resources.

== Arrest ==
On December 15, 2016, Lapshin was arrested in Minsk at the request of Azerbaijan for alleged illegal crossing of the Azerbaijan border and incitements against the state. Lapshin visited Nagorno-Karabakh (which is internationally recognized as a part of Azerbaijan) twice, in 2011 and 2012, resulting in the "blacklisting" by Azerbaijan.

Belarus extradited Lapshin to Azerbaijan on February 7, 2017. Diplomats of Russia, Israel and Armenia attempted to prevent his extradition to Azerbaijan. The representative of the US State Department, John Kirby, spoke about the Lapshin case. A protest in connection with the extradition of Lapshin was also announced by the Council of Europe, the OSCE, Amnesty International, HRW and CPJ.

Numerous Israeli, Russian, Turkish, Czech and EU politicians condemned Lapshin’s extradition and demanded his release.

A court in Baku sentenced Lapshin to three years in prison. Three months later, on September 11, 2017, Ilham Aliyev signed a decree to pardon Alexander Lapshin, after which he was able to fly from Baku to Tel Aviv.

== Attempted murder ==
On the night of September 11, 2017, Lapshin was attacked in a solitary confinement cell of a Baku pre-trial detention center. The next morning, Ali Hasanov, a personal adviser to the president, made a statement that Lapshin had attempted suicide, but that the prison guards managed to save his life. It was also stated that, in connection with this incident, it was decided to pardon him by presidential decree. Lapshin spent three days in the intensive care unit of a Baku hospital and then was deported to Israel. After arriving in Israel, Lapshin made a statement to the press that he had not attempted suicide and that he had been attacked in Baku with the aim of murder. Medical examinations conducted in Israel confirmed the blogger’s version of the attempted murder, which contradicted the official position of the Baku authorities. Independent experts in Russia and the Netherlands also confirmed the assassination version, which became the basis for filing a complaint against Azerbaijan to the European Court of Human Rights in Strasbourg.

== Lapshin's appeal to the ECHR ==
At the beginning of 2018, Alexander Lapshin filed a lawsuit against Azerbaijan in the European Court of Human Rights (EHCR), in which he accused Azerbaijan of attempted murder, torture and illegal imprisonment. On May 20, 2021, the European Court of Human Rights in Strasbourg ruled on the blogger's complaint against the Republic of Azerbaijan, finding the country's authorities responsible for the illegal arrest, torture and attempted murder of Lapshin.

== UN Human Rights Committee on the case of Lapshin ==
On July 19, 2022, the UN Human Rights Committee adopted a view recognizing the Belarusian authorities as guilty of the illegal arrest and subsequent extradition to Azerbaijan of Alexander Lapshin. The resolution emphasizes that visiting Nagorno-Karabakh as a journalist cannot be considered a criminal offense and also states that the extradition to Azerbaijan potentially threatened the journalist's life and should not have occurred.
