= Tevanik =

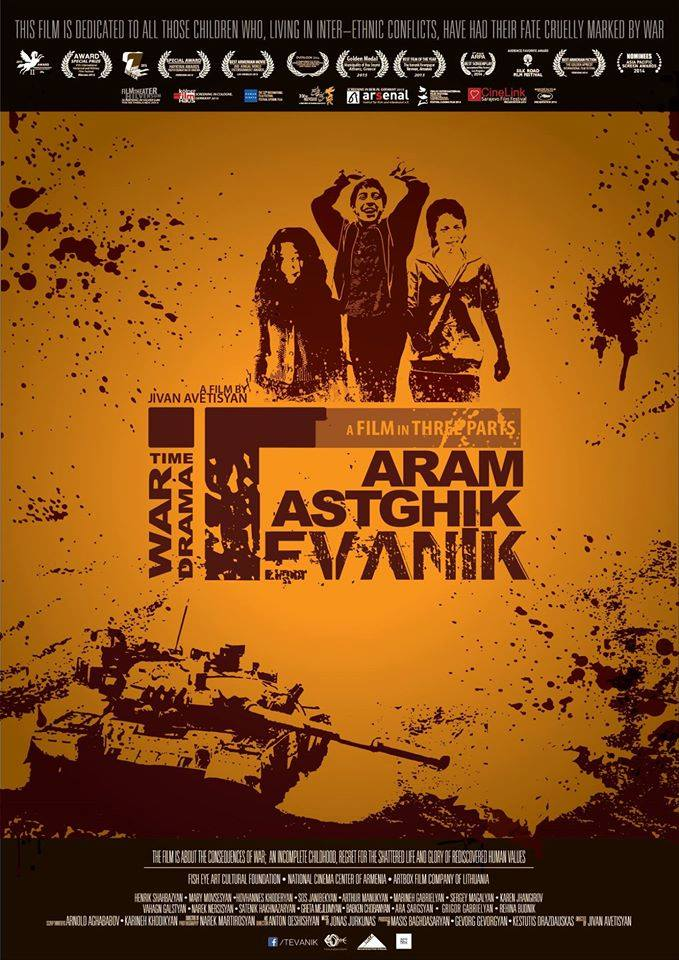
- Film poster
- Armenian: Թևանիկ
- Directed by: Jivan Avetisyan
- Release date: May 2014
- Running time: 81 minutes
- Countries: Armenia; Lithuania; Germany; France; Bulgaria; Czech Republic; Italy; USA
- Languages: Armenian, with Russian, English, French, Greek, Dutch, Spanish, Rumanian, Iranian, Polish subtitles

Tevanik (Armenian: «Թևանիկ») is a 2014 drama film directed by Jivan Avetisyan with Arnold Aghababov, Karineh Khodikyan as scriptwriters. It is an international co-production and was created again with the collaboration of the National Cinema Center of Armenia and Artbox Production House of Lithuania.

Tevanik has won over ten “Best Feature Film” awards around the globe including in China, Italy, Poland, Romania, Russia, and US. The film has also received numerous worldwide recognition in addition to winning the Armenian Panorama category, Golden Apricot (1st Prize) at the Golden Apricot 11th International Film Festival in Yerevan, Armenia.

== Plot ==
Set in the 1990s during the First Nagorno-Karabakh War, is a three-part movie; the first part is about little Aram's harmonious family who tragically gets separated in one day. Aram's entire childhood ends. The second part of the film centers on Astghik. Peace turns to war and she loses her friendship, her love, and her idol. Finally, the third part of the film tells a story of 14-year old, Tevanik, who becomes part of a war that changes him forever.

== Cast ==
- Henrik Shahbazyan (Armenia) as Aram
- Mary Movsesyan (Armenia) as Astghik
- Hovhannes Khoderyan (Armenia) as Tevanik
- Sos Janibekyan (Armenia) as Avo
- Arthur Manukyan (Armenia) as Gurgen
- Marineh Gabrielyan (Armenia) as Aram's Mother
- Sergey Magalyan (Armenia) as Osep
- Karen Jhangirov (Armenia) as Old teacher
- Vahagn Galstyan (Armenia) as Vasil
- Narek Nersisyan (Armenia) as Barber's Client
- Satenik Hakhnazaryan (Armenia) as Astghik's Mother
- Greta Mejlumyan (Armenia) as Tevanik's Grandma
- Babken Chobanyan (Armenia) as Commander
- Ara Sargsyan (Armenia) as Meruzh
- Grigor Gabrielyan (Armenia) as Badal
- Reina Boudnik (Belorussia) as Sniper

== Filmmakers ==
- Director - Jivan Avetisyan (Armenia)
- Scriptwriters - Arnold Aghababov (Armenia), Karineh Khodikyan (Armenia)
- Producers - Masis Baghdasaryan (Armenia), Gevork Gevorkyan (Armenia)
- Co-Producer - Kęstutis Drazdauskas (Lithuania)
- Music - Jonas Jurkūnas (Lithuania)
- Director of Photography - Narek Martirosyan (Armenia)
- Editor - Arsen Sargsyan (Armenia)
- Art Director - Anton Qeshishyan (Armenia)
- Graphic Design - Armen Tsagharyan (Armenia)
- Sound Director - Hayk Israelyan (Armenia)
- Visual Effects Arts - Vytautas Kazlauskas (Lithuania)
- Camera and Electrical Department - Andranik Sahakyan (Armenia)
- Lighting Technician - Narek Sargsyan (Armenia)

== Awards, nominations, and honorable mention ==
Year	Country	Festival	Award/Participation
2016	Los Angeles, USA	Hollywood & Beyond's Film Festival	Best International Feature Film
2016	Ufa, Russia	“Silver Akbuzat” International Film Festival	Best Director of Photography
2016	Cannes, France	Cannes International Film Market	For distribution
2015	Warsaw, Poland	International Historical and Military Film Festival	Special Prize
2015	Romania	The Romania International Film Festival	Best Film
2015	Los Angeles, USA	Annual World Entertainment Awards	Best Armenian Movie
2014	Los Angeles, USA	Arpa International Film Festival	Best Screenplay
2014	Xi'an, China	First Silk Road International Film Festival	People's Choice Award
2014	Rome, Italy	Overlook International Film Festival	Jury award for Best Original Work
2014	Yerevan, Armenia	Golden Apricot International Film Festival	Best Armenian Fiction
2014	Cannes, France	Cannes International Film Market	For distribution
2013	Talin, Estonia	Baltik Event Film Market	For distribution and development
2013	Cannes, France	Cannes International Film Market	For distribution and development

=== Other awards and mentions ===
- Received Special award of Haykyan Awards of the Youth Foundation of Armenia was awarded
- Avetisyan was also awarded a gold medal by the municipality of Nea Smyrni, Athens
