= Ibad Huseynov =

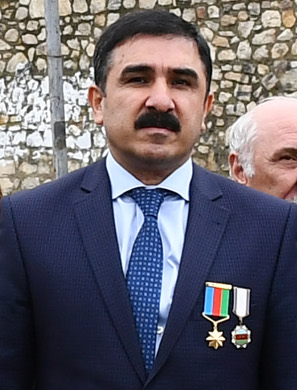
- Ibad Huseynov in 2021
- Born: October 18, 1970 (age 56); Khojavend, Azerbaijan SSR, USSR
- Military career
- Allegiance: USSR; Azerbaijan
- Branch: Azerbaijani Army
- Service years: 1988–1997
- Unit: Azerbaijani Armed Forces
- Commands: Reconnaissance and sabotage group
- Conflicts: First Nagorno-Karabakh War
- Awards: Azerbaijani Flag Order

Ibad Movsum oghlu Huseynov (Azerbaijani: İbad Mövsüm oğlu Hüseynov) is an Azerbaijani military man officer who was awarded the honor of National Hero of Azerbaijan for his participation in the 1990–1994 First Nagorno-Karabakh War.

== Awards ==
- In 1994 he was awarded “Azerbaijani Flag” order.
- On December 9, 2020, he was awarded the title of "National Hero of Azerbaijan" by President Ilham Aliyev.
