= Ramiz Azizbeyli =

Azerbaijani actor, film director and screenwriter

Ramiz Azizbeyli Ramiz Əzizbəyli
- Born: July 20, 1948; Baku, Azerbaijan SSR, USSR
- Died: June 9, 2021 (aged 72); Baku, Azerbaijan
- Burial place: Yasamal cemetery
- Education: Azerbaijan State Institute of Arts
- Occupations: Actor, film director, screenwriter
- Awards

Ramiz Haji Agha oghlu Azizbeyli (Azerbaijani: Ramiz Hacı Ağa oğlu Əzizbəyli, July 20, 1948 – June 9, 2021) was an Azerbaijani actor, film director, screenwriter, People's Artiste of Azerbaijan (2008). "Haji Zeynalabdin Tagiyev" and "Golden Buta" awards laureate.

== Biography ==
Ramiz Azizbeyli was born on July 20, 1948, in Baku. He graduated from the cultural-educational faculty of the Azerbaijan State Institute of Arts. He worked at "Azerbaijanfilm" film studio. His filmography includes about 100 screen works.

In 1987, he started his directing career with the short feature film "Pirverdi's Rooster", which he shot at "Debut" studio. The film was awarded the prize for director's debut at the All-Union festival held in Kyiv. Ramiz Azizbeyli's 1991 full-length feature film "Ring of Fortune" was awarded a special diploma at the film festival of Asian and Latin American countries held in Tashkent.

Ramiz Azizbeyli taught at the Azerbaijan State University of Culture and Arts and was the head of the Department of Variety and Musical Theater Directing.

== Death ==
The actor suffered three strokes. He had long been suffering from high blood pressure and diabetes. He had undergone amputation of the toes on one of his feet. A while ago, the actor had been admitted to a modular hospital in the Zigh settlement, which was treating COVID-19 patients. It was announced that he had suffered a heart attack. Ramiz Azizbeyli died on June 9, 2021, after a prolonged illness. He was buried in the Wolf's Gate cemetery.

== Filmography ==
1. 1962 – Labor and Red Rose

2. 1964 – The Magic Cloak

3. 1977 – The Lion Left the House

4. 1978 – My Wife, My Children

5. 1978 – In the Land of Jinn

6. 1984 – Asif, Vasif, Agasif

7. 1984 – Saddle the Horses

8. 1985 – 100

9. 1985 – The Legend of Gümüşgöl

10. 1986 – Wait for the Signal from the Sea

11. 1986 – The Old Ferryboat

12. 1986 – Genie in the Microdistrict

13. 1986 – Emergency Situation

14. 1986 – The Season of the Garden

15. 1986 – The Abduction of the Groom

16. 1987 – The Devil in Sight

17. 1988 – The Window of Sorrow

18. 1988 – Personal Visit to the German Clinic

19. 1990 – The Witness Girl

20. 1991 – Ghazalkhan

== Awards ==
- People's Artiste of Azerbaijan — August 1, 2008
- Honored Artist of Azerbaijan — December 18, 2000
- Shohrat Order — August 1, 2018
