= Fuad Poladov =

Azerbaijani actor

Fuad Agarahim Poladov
- Born: 24 May 1948; Baku, Azerbaijan
- Died: 5 May 2018 (aged 69); Baku, Azerbaijan
- Occupation: Actor
- Years active: 1966–2018

Fuad Agarahim Poladov (24 May 1948 – 5 May 2018) was an Azerbaijani theater and cinema actor. He received the title Honored Artist of the Azerbaijan SSR, and People's Artist of the Azerbaijan SSR (20 March 1987).

== Biography ==
He started his career with the role of Selim in the 1966 The Investigation Continues. He graduated at the Drama and Cinema Acting faculty of ASEI (1967–1972). He played Savalan in the theater movie The Ruined Diaries. The premiere was entered into the actor's troupe after the play was performed on 29 November 1969. On 20 March 1987 he was awarded the honorary title of People's Artist of the Azerbaijan SSR.

Since 1989 he has been the actor of the Azerbaijan State Russian Drama Theater named after Samad Vurgun. He was awarded the Golden Pearce Award for Best Actor Award for Actor in 2015.
