= Richard Sammel =

German actor (born 1960)

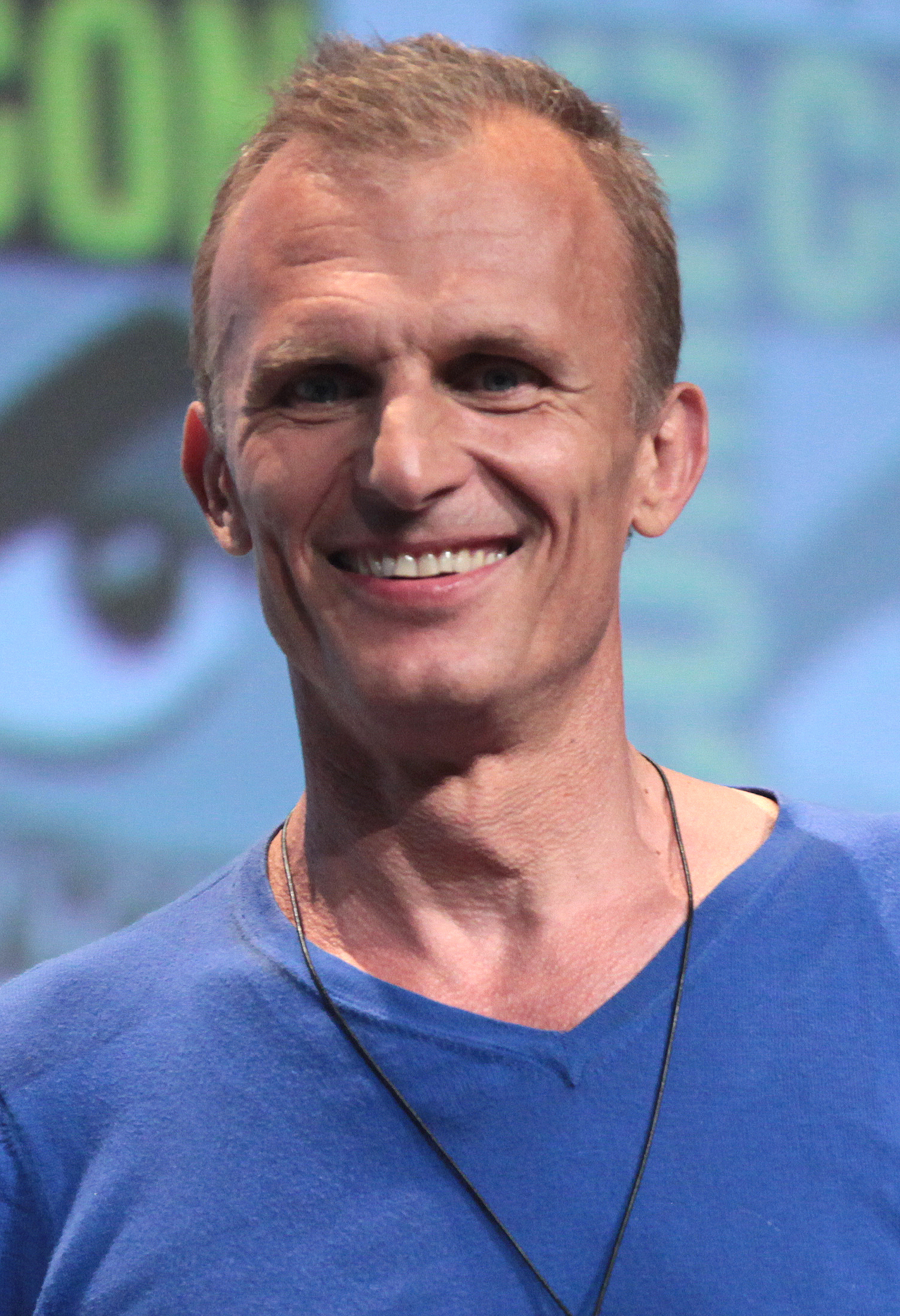
- Sammel at the 2015 San Diego Comic-Con
- Born: 13 October 1960 (age 65); Heidelberg, Baden-Württemberg, West Germany
- Occupation: Actor
- Years active: 1991–present

Richard Sammel (born 13 October 1960) is a German actor. He is best known to United States audiences for his roles as Sergeant Werner Rachtman in Inglourious Basterds (2009) and as Thomas Eichhorst in The Strain (2014–2017). He has appeared in more than 100 films and television series since 1991.

== Personal life and career ==
Sammel was born in Heidelberg, Germany. In addition to his native German, he is also fluent in English, French and Italian, and proficient in Spanish.

In 2009, Sammel played Nazi Sergeant Werner Rachtman in Quentin Tarantino's Inglourious Basterds (2009).

In 2015, he was nominated for the Best Supporting Actor on Television at the 41st Saturn Awards, for his role as Thomas Eichhorst in the FX vampire horror television series The Strain (2014–2017), created by Guillermo del Toro and Chuck Hogan.

in 2021, he appeared as Bernhardt Mueller in French thriller miniseries The Rope, alongside Suzanne Clément and Jakob Cedergren.

In 2025, Sammel appeared in a prominent supporting role in the second season of the Star Wars series Andor, playing Carro Rylanz, the leader of a resistance group on the planet Ghorman.

He resides in Paris and Berlin with his girlfriend and his son. He also has two daughters.

== Selected filmography ==
Film
Year	Title	Role	Notes
1997	Life Is Beautiful	German Officer At Train Station	
1998	Taxi	German Gangster Leader	
1999	On the Road to Timbuktu: Explorers in Africa	Voice-Over	Documentary film
2002	The Nest	Winfried	
2002	Safe Conduct	Richard Pottier	
2006	OSS 117: Cairo, Nest of Spies	Moeller	
2006	Casino Royale	Adolph Gettler	
2009	Inglourious Basterds	Sergeant Werner Rachtman	
2009–2017	Un village français	Heinrich Müller	
2010	Joséphine, ange gardien	Berlin Officer	TV series; Episode: "Joséphine fait de la résistance"
2011	Sniper: Reloaded	Colonel Ralf Jäger	
2011	Apartment in Athens	Captain Kalter	
2012	The Third Half	Rudolph Spitz	
2013	Road 47	Colonel Mayer	
2013	Company of Heroes	Commandant Beimler	
2014	3 Days to Kill	Wolfgang "The Wolf" Braun	
2014	Colt 45	Major	
2014–2017	The Strain	Thomas Eichhorst	TV series
2016	The Confessions	German Minister	
2018	The Delegation	Head of The Delegation	
2019	The Name of the Rose	Malachia of Hildesheim	Miniseries
2019	Gate to Heaven	Robert Sternvall	
2020	The Head	Erik Osterland	
2021	Spencer	Prince Philip, Duke of Edinburgh	Minor role
2021	The Rope	Bernhardt Mueller	Miniseries
2022	That Dirty Black Bag	Morrison	
2022	Neneh Superstar	Victor Max	
2023	The Order of Time	Viktor	
2024	Rich Flu	Von Willebrand	
2025	Andor	Carro Rylanz (Dubs in both French and German)	TV series; 5 episodes
2026	Dear England	Thomas Tuchel	TV series; 1 episode

== Awards and nominations ==
Year	Award	Category	Nominated work	Result
2015	Saturn Awards	Best Supporting Actor on Television	The Strain	Nominated
