= Vagif Mustafayev =

Azerbaijani screenwriter and actor

- Born: August 28, 1953 (age 72); Baku, Azerbaijani SSR, USSR
- Occupations: Film director, producer, screenwriter
- Years active: 1982–present

Vagif Mustafayev (born August 28, 1953) is an Azerbaijani film director, producer and screenwriter. Since 2006 he has been the president of the Space TV and Radio Company.

== Biography ==
In 1982, he was accepted on two-year higher courses for script-writers and directors at the USSR State Cinema in Moscow (Eldar Ryazanov's creative workshop). Having completed the higher courses, he worked at the Azerbaijanfilm studio as a director and producer of feature films from 1985. Between 2001 and 2006 he was deputy minister of culture of the Azerbaijan Republic. Russia's National Academy of the Cinematic Arts and Sciences awarded Vagif Mustafayev a Gold Medal for his contribution to film-making.

In 2007, Vagif Mustafayev was chairman of the jury at the 10th Anniversary Eurasian TV Forum held by the Eurasian Academy of TV and Radio, where he was awarded the prestigious prize International Olympus. In the same year, he was also awarded the Badge of Honour for Contributions to Friendship of the Russian Foreign Ministry's Russia Abroad Centre.

Vagif Mustafayev held a master class on Laughter Brings Peoples Closer for film and TV personnel from more than 20 countries at the Russian Union of Film-Makers' House of Cinema on 8 November 2008, as part of the 11th Eurasian TV Forum.

Vagif Mustafayev filmed and showed several major projects over the course of 2009. The six-part documentary 'History of Our Security' (2009) was the first frank, extensive account of the history of the security bodies in Azerbaijan from 1918 to the present day.

The documentary 'Strategy of Success' (2009) about Heydar Aliyev's creation of the State Oil Fund of Azerbaijan.

Mustafayev's next significant work was the documentary "Allaha Shukur" (Thank God) in 2009 about the life and work of the public and religious figure, the 12th Sheikh ul-Islam, chairman of the Board of Muslims of the Caucasus, Haji Allahshukur Pashazade. Vagif Mustafayev was for the second time elected chairman of the authoritative international jury of the 12th Eurasian TV Forum, held in Moscow from 26 to 30 November 2009.

Vagif Mustafayev headed the jury at the Sixth International Festival of War and Patriotic Films, which was held from 16 to 20 December 2009 in Volokolamsk (Moscow Region) and was dedicated to the 65th anniversary of victory in the Second World War.

In 2010, Vagif Mustafayev shot a four-part documentary 'The History of Oil in Azerbaijan'.

In 2011, well-known director, People's Artiste of the Azerbaijan Republic, film director, winner of Azerbaijan's State Prize, vice-president of the European Academy of Television Vagif Mustafayev shot the 11th film about the former President of Azerbaijan Heydar Aliyev titled 'Heydar Aliyev. The State'.

Between 1999 and 2013, Vagif Mustafayev made 12 films about the life and work of Aliyev.

=== Filmography ===
- Fikret Amirov (2022)
- Life Seems to Be Beautiful (2022)
- Inspection (2007)
- National Bomb (2004)
- Black Mark (2003)
- Between Earth and Sky (1999)
- Everything for Better (1997)
- French (1995)
- Alone (1991)
- The Scoundrel (1988 film)
- Villain (1987)

== Awards ==
Vagif Mustafayev has been awarded the Order of Glory of the Azerbaijan Republic and the Order of Honour of Georgia. He also won the prize and diploma for his Outstanding Contribution to the Development of Film and Television at the 13th Eurasian TV Forum, held in Moscow in November 2011.

In 2022, Mustafayev was awarded by the "Best Director" award at the Korkut Ata Film Festival held in Bursa, Turkey.
