= Gate to Heaven =

- Armenian: Դրախտի դարպասը
- Directed by: Jivan Avetisyan
- Produced by: Masis Baghdasaryan, Kestutis Drazdauskas, Adrineh Mirzayan (Executive Producer)
- Starring: Richard Sammel; Tatiana Spivakova; Sos Janibekyan; Leonardas Pobedonoscevas; Naira Zakaryan; Nina Kronjäger; Benedict Freitag
- Music by: Michele Josia
- Release date: 17 October 2019
- Running time: 91 minutes
- Countries: Armenia; Lithuania; Germany; France; Bulgaria; Czech Republic; Italy; USA
- Languages: English, Armenian, German, French, with English subtitles

Gate to Heaven (Armenian: Դրախտի դարպասը, romanized: Drakhti darpasy) is a 2019 historical drama film directed by Jivan Avetisyan, with scriptwriter Artavazd Yeghiazaryan, and co-scriptwriter Mko Malkhasyan. It is an international co-production by producers in Lithuania, Germany, and France and post-production producers in Czech Republic and Bulgaria along with the collaboration of the National Cinema Center of Armenia, with musical composition by Italian composer Michele Josia.

Set during the 2016 four-day war in Nagorno-Karabakh in the Caucasus Mountains, the story centers around Robert Sternvall (Richard Sammel), a German journalist who returns to the region to cover the armed conflict. During his journalistic investigation, Robert meets a young opera singer (Tatiana Spivakova), who happens to be the daughter of missing photojournalist Edgar Martirosyan, whom Robert had previously abandoned in captivity during the fall of the village of Talish in 1992. Robert and Sophia's frequent rendezvouses ignite a passionate romance. The film also features Sos Janibekyan, Naira Zakaryan, Leo Pobedonoscevas Benedict Freitag, Nina Kronjager, Armen Sargsyan, Aram Karakhanyan, and Elfik Zohrabyan in supporting roles.

Hrachya Danielyan was one of the sponsors of the film.

Gate to Heaven held a private premiere in Yerevan, Armenia on 17 October 2019. Armenia's Prime Minister, Nikol Pashinyan and Ministry of Foreign Affairs, Zohrab Mnatsakanyan were also in attendance. It was among 28 selected projects by the European Work in Progress Cologne which was held in October 2019.

== Plot ==
In April 2016, Robert Sternvall (Richard Sammel), a German journalist, learns about the resumption of military actions in Nagorno-Karabakh and leaves Berlin to cover them. The articles on Operation "Koltso" ("Ring") during the first war in Karabakh brought him great fame years ago. This time his car is bombed and he is taken to a hospital in Yerevan. While the local journalist Michael Movsisyan is suspended from works for endangering Robert's life, Robert is invited to a charity opera concert in Yerevan with the participation of a young opera singer Sophia Marti and French tenor Jean Milosh who is courting her.

After the concert, Robert, fascinated by Sophia, suggests arranging a photo shooting and writing an article about her. Soon Robert and Sophia's relationship becomes warmer and takes a romantic turn thus triggering Jeans' fierce jealousy. Sophia suggests Robert visit her favorite childhood place – a gorge known as the "Gate to Heaven", which she used to visit with her late father, photographer Edgar Martirosyan. Edgar had been taken prisoner and killed during the war in 1992. Nevertheless, Robert fails to turn up at the agreed time; instead, he takes a flight to Germany. Meanwhile, during his private investigation, Michael discovers the dark side of Robert's life.

Robert is getting ready for his grand exhibition in Berlin. Sophia comes to the opening ceremony and urges Robert to tell the true reasons of his visit to Talish. It is revealed that the photos, presenting the horrors of the Operation "Koltso" in Talish, were taken by Edgar Martirosyan. Furthermore, Edgar and Robert had met in Talish. On the day of Talish's fall, when defending his own house with a gun, Edgar passed all the photos to Robert for him to take them to the Artsakh press. Instead, Robert appropriated them and published them under his name, while Edgar was captured. Years later, when the military operations restart in Talish, Robert decided not only to cover the developments, but also to find Edgar's relatives and extend his apologies to them. However, after meeting Sophia and learning about her origins, he feels unable to confess at the last moment.

Sophia leaves. Shortly afterwards Robert publishes his book Confession at the Gate to Heaven, where he reveals the truth about these events and republishes the photos under Edgar's name. Michael visits Sophia at her parental house in Talish and gives her the book.

== Cast ==
- Richard Sammel (Germany) – as Robert Sternvall
- Tatiana Spivakova (France) – as Sophia Marti
- Sos Janibekyan (Armenia) – as Michael Movsisyan
- Naira Zakaryan (US) –as Tereza Poghosyan
- Leo Pobedonoscevas (Lithuania) – as Jean Milosh
- Benedict Freitag (Germany) – as Eduard Hoffman
- Nina Kronjäger (Germany) – as Laura Sternvall
- Armen Sargsyan (Armenia) –as Edgar Martirosyan
- Roffi Petrossian (Armenia) – as young Robert Sternvall
- Arthur Manukyan (Armenia) – as Father Grigor
- Martin Aloyan (Armenia) – as Norayr Gharabekyan (Conductor)
- Mikayel Hajyan (Armenia) – as Hakob Varanosyan
- Arsen Ghazaryan (Armenia) – as Doctor Arakelyan
- Aram Karakhanyan (Armenia) – as James Colbert
- Elfik Zohrabyan (Armenia)- as German Journalist

== Production ==
Those involved in the making of the film included:

- Director - Jivan Avetisyan (Armenia)
- Screenwriter - Artavazd Yeghiazaryan (Armenia)
- Producers - Masis Baghdasaryan (Armenia), Kestutis Drazdauskas (Lithuania)
- Executive producer: Adrineh Mirzayan (USA)
- Co-producer - Marco Gilles (Germany)
- Associate producers - Robert Hofferer (Austria), Angelika Schouler
- Line producer - Narine Voskanyan (Armenia)
- Cinematography - Rytis Kurkulis (Lithuania)
- Art directors - Sevakn Baghdasaryan (Armenia), Jurgita Gerdvilaitė (Lithuania)
- Music - Michele Josia (Italy)
- Editor - Eimantas Belickas (Lithuania)

== Reception ==
=== Critical response ===
Cineuropa praised the film for the "psychological depth" of its "well-written lead characters" backed by "solid interpretations and a good supporting cast". The review also highlighted the "beautifully crafted cinematography" and composer Michele Josia's "gripping score".

=== Awards and participations ===
Year	Country	Festival	Award / Participation
2022	Canada	Pomegranate Film Festival	“Best Feature Film”
2022	USA	Las Vegas International Film and Screenwriting Festival	Finalist
2022	United Kingdom	BELIFF Be Epic! Film Festival London	“Best Cinematography”
2022	USA	Beverly Hills Film Festival	Official selection
2022	USA	WorldFest-Houston International Film Festival	Remi Winner
2022	Australia	Armenian Film Festival Australia	Official Selection
2022	Armenia	Anahit Award	“Best Sound Mixing” and “Best Production Design”
2021	Canada	Ontario International Film Festival	"Best Sound", "Best Music", "Best Script" and "Best International Film"
2021	Indonesia	Europe on Screen Film Festival, Jakarta	Official Program
2021	Italy	Salento International Film Festival	Official Selection and Spotlight (Opening Film)
2021	USA	Las Cruces International Film Festival	Official Selection
2021	USA	American Tracks Music Award	Finalist for “Best Score of the Month”
2020	USA	Global Music Awards	Silver Medal, Outstanding Achievement “Regarding the Controversial and Critical Acclaimed Film”
2020	Germany	Cinema for Peace	Virtual screening of Gate to Heaven and Conference for Peace on Nagorno Karabakh
2020	Russia	Moscow International Film Festival	Non-Competition Category in official program
2019	Germany	European Work in Progress Cologne	Presentation of the project
