= Sos Janibekyan =

Armenian actor, writer and producer

Sos Janibekyan Սոս Ջանիբեկյան
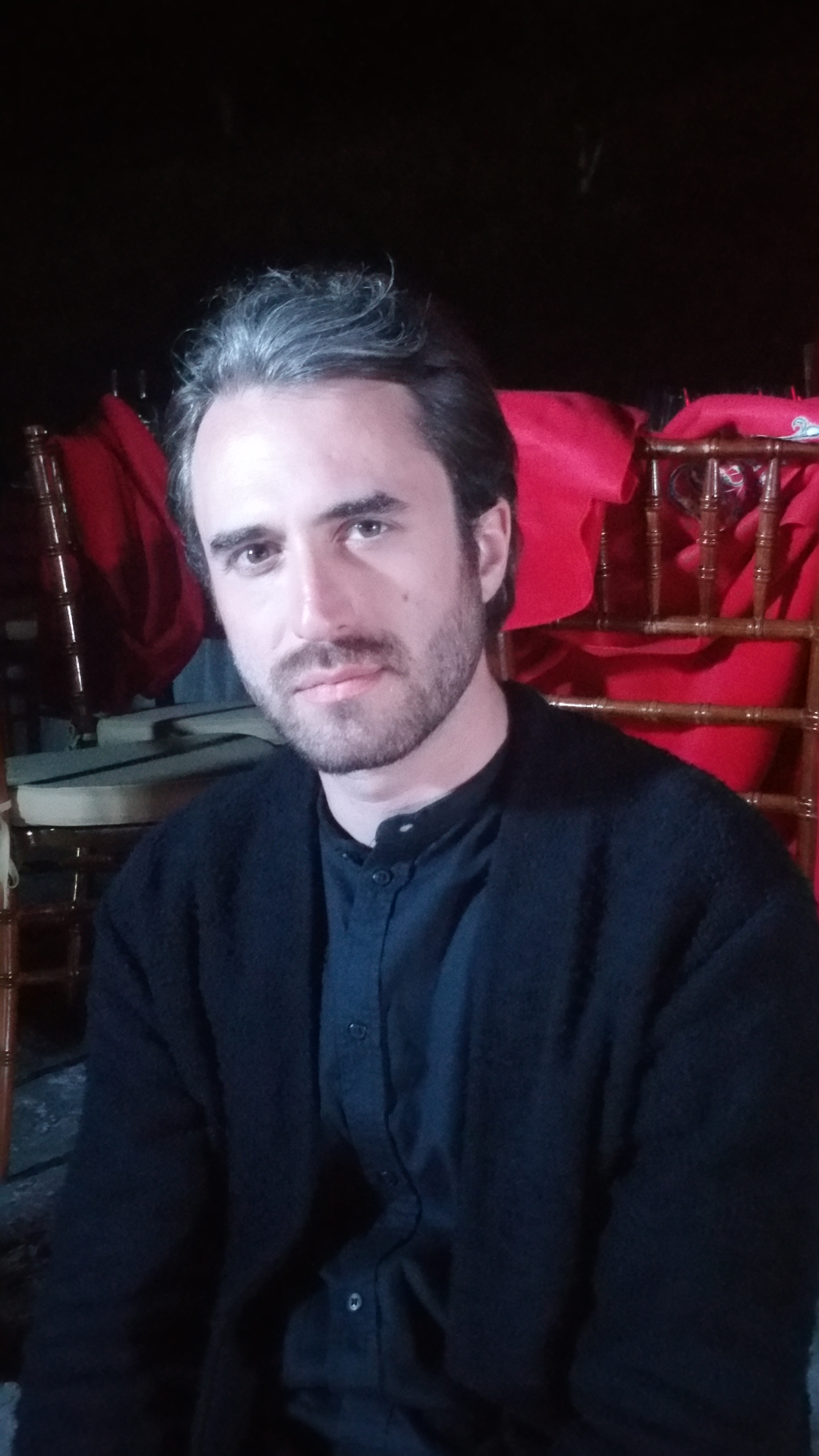
- Born: Sos Janibekyan Սոս Ջանիբեկյան; April 8, 1988 (age 37); Yerevan, Armenian SSR, Soviet Union
- Citizenship: Armenia
- Education: Yerevan State Institute of Theatre and Cinematography
- Occupations: Actor, writer, producer
- Years active: 2004–present
- Height: 173 cm (5 ft 8 in)
- Parents: Կարեն Ջանիբեկյան (father); Անահիտ Աղասարյան (mother)

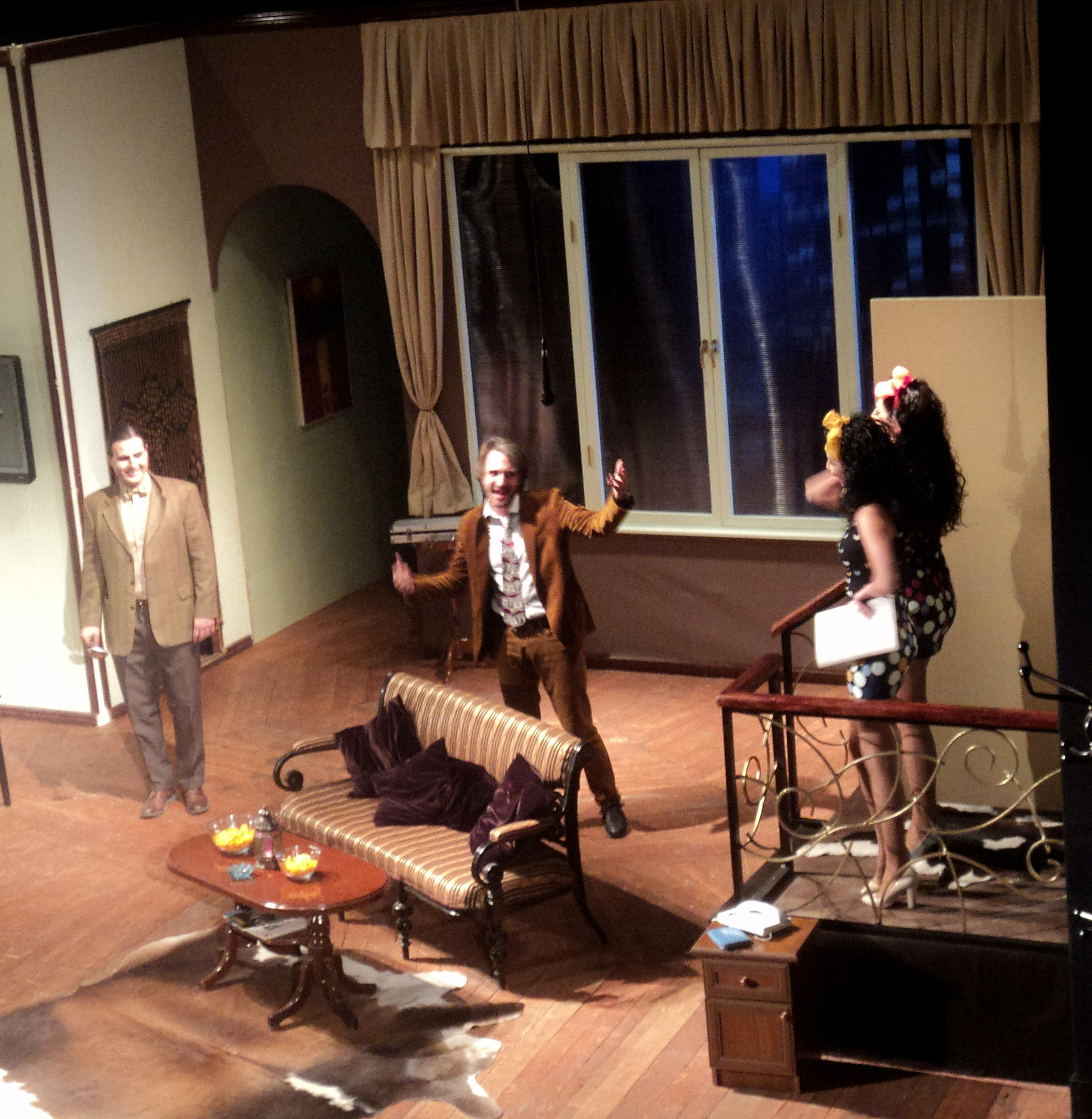

Sos Janibekyan (Armenian: Սոս Ջանիբեկյան, born on April 8, 1988), is an Armenian actor, writer and producer. He is known for his role as Gokor on Trapped. He was a guest of White corner on September 25, 2014. The films Four Buddies and the Bride (2015), Trap (2015), and The fiancé from the circus (2011) all feature Sos Janibekyan.

== Filmography ==
Film
Year	Title	Role	Notes
2005	Bonded parallels		
2005	Potters		
2007	Taxi, Chill Out		
2011	Groom from the circus		
2012	Pheasant hunter		Short
2013	Step with horse		
2013	Lost Legacy	Levon Mantashev	
2014	Half Moon Bay		
2014	Tevanik		
2014	Instead of someone		
2014	Shooter 2		
2015	Scotch & Whiskey		
2015	Trapped		
2015	North-South		
2015	11:41		
2016	Earthquake	Senik	(post-production)
2016	The Last Inhabitant		
2018	Armen and Me: Armeniya	Levon	
2019	Gate to Heaven	Michael Movsisyan	
2020	Songs of Solomon	Sarkis	
2023	Operation Honorable Beggars	Poghos	
2024	The Reverse Side of the Medal	Edgar	

Television and web
Year	Title	Role	Notes
2015–2017	Domino (Armenian TV series)	Mika	Main Cast
2016-2017	The Desirable Groom	Himself	Reality TV show
2017	Countdown	Hayk	Main Cast
2019	Chaos (Armenian mini-series adaptation)	Miqayel Alimyan	Main Cast
2020	For the Sake of honor (Armenian mini-series adaptation)	Artashes	Main Cast
2020	Anatolian Story	Erdem Ghazi	Main Cast
2021	The Lost Diary	Davit	Main Cast
2025	11	Arsen	Main Cast

Music Video
Year	Title	Artist
2014	At this moment	Mi kani hogi (Several people)
2015	Bakhtaber	Arman Tovmasyan
