= Yashar Nuri =

Azerbaijani actor

Yaşar Nuri
- Born: Yaşar Məmmədsadıq oğlu Nuriyev; September 3, 1951; Baku, Azerbaijani SSR
- Died: November 22, 2012 (aged 61); Baku, Azerbaijan
- Occupation: Actor
- Years active: 1974–2012
- Spouse: Rahima Nuri

Yashar Nuri (Azerbaijani: Yaşar Nuri; September 3, 1951 – November 22, 2012) was an Azerbaijani film, television, and theater actor and a member of the Azerbaijan State Academic Drama Theatre. He appeared in more than fifty Azerbaijani and Soviet era films, as well as more than 100 television and stage roles.

== Biography ==
He was born into the family of actor Mamedsadig Nuriyev and first appeared on stage at the age of 11, playing the role of Tapdyga in the play "Toy Kimindir?" ("Whose wedding is this?") At the Azerbaijan State Theater of Musical Comedy. While studying at school, he was a child and youth programmer who participated in drama circles. In 1968, he graduated from secondary school No. 173 in Baku and entered the faculty of film acting of the Azerbaijan State Institute of Arts for the course of Rza Takhmasib and Aligeydar Alekperov. During his studies, he played roles in several productions, including "Sevil" (Balash), "Wedding" (Salmanov) and "Guilty Without Guilt" (Neznamov). In 1972, after graduating from the institute, he served in the army for a year and, having returned, worked as an actor in the educational theater of the institute. In 1974, at the invitation of the chief director of the Academic National Drama Theater, he was accepted into the acting company of the collective. In 1975, he married Rakhime khanum, who was a doctor. They had two daughters (Ulkar, Ulviyya). He was sick for a long time and in 2011 was in intensive care. Yashar Nuri died on the morning of November 22, 2012, in Baku.

== Creation ==
Nuri starred in about 50 feature films and more than 100 television productions. Many of the television dramas in which he starred in the main role, entered the gold fund of Azerbaijani television. Among them,"When Roads Meet"( Yollar görüşəndə), "Life Paths" (Ömrün yolları), "Houses Along" (Evləri köndələn yar), ("The Disturbed Piano" ) and "Gatarda" ("In the train")s. He appears in the films "Bayin Ogurlanmasy" ("The Abduction of the Bridegroom"), "Yaramaz" ("Bastard"), "Jokhlama" ("Check"), "Yol Echvalates" ("Road Accident"). In addition to the theater, Yashar Nuri collaborated with radio. He was a participant in humorous radio programs ("Good Morning", "Evening of Laughter"). In the film studio "Azerbaijanfilm" he voiced local films and dubbed foreign films. Y. Nuri was also the director of a number of films and performances. He was the director of the movie "Thank you" (Спасибо).

== Anniversaries ==
Y. Nuri's jubilees are always held solemnly. In 1981, on the 30-year anniversary of Y. Nuri, he was awarded the title of People's Artist of the Azerbaijan SSR for the first time. In 1991, for his role in the film "Bastard" received a state award. In 1996, for the 45th birthday of the actor, in 2001, for the 50th anniversary, feature films "Yashar of Our Scene" ("səhnəmizin Yaşarı"), "Yashar is whom he is" (Yashar olduğu kimi) were made. In 2011, the 60th anniversary of Yashar Nuri was celebrated at the Azerbaijan State Academic National Drama Theater. In 1989, he was named a People's Artist of Azerbaijan, as the country was part of the Soviet Union at the time, and awarded the Shohrat Order. Born in Baku on September 3, 1951, Nuri died on November 22, 2012, at the age of 61.

== Filmography ==
- 1974 – Winds blow in Baku (Bakıda küləklər əsir) – soldier, voice
- 1975 – Apple as an apple (Alma almaya bənzər) – Mehti, voice
- 1975 -Four Sunday (Dörd bazar günü) – Seyran
- 1976 – Look for us in the mountains (Bizi dağlarda axtarın) – Geologist
- 1976 – Mesozoic history (Mezozoy əhvalatı) – Rauf
- 1977 – Birthday (Ad günü) – Eldar
- 1977 – The Lion left the house (Şir evdən getdi) – Dad
- 1983 – Music teacher (Musiqi müəllimi) – Bashir
- 1983 – Hash with music – translator
- 1985 – The bridegroom was stolen (Bəyin oğurlanması) – Israfil
- 1987 – Sureia – Musa
- 1987 – The Devil Under the Windshield (Şeytan göz qabağında)
- 1989 – Bastard (Yaramaz) – Mashalla
- 1990 – Diversion (Təxribat) – Rahimov
- 1990 – The day of execution (Qətl günü) – Mahmud
- 1991 – Gazelkhan – Director
- 1991 – The Window- Nasib
- 1997 – All for the Better (Hər şey yaxşılığa doğru) – Abdulgani
- 1999 – How wonderful this world is (Nə gözəldir bu dünya...) – director of a psychiatric hospital
- 2000 – Bremen Town Musicians & Co-Guard of the King
- 2003 – The Black Mark – The Pilot
- 2003 – Mähällä
- 2003 – National bomb producer (Milli bomba) – Abdulgani
- 2005 – Template: Be a man
- 2014 - I'm Coming Home

== Ranks and awards ==
- 1981 – Honored Artist of the Azerbaijan SSR.
- 1989 – People's Artist of the Azerbaijan SSR.
- 1991 – State Prize of the Azerbaijan SSR (for his role in the film ("The Git").
- 1992, 1996 – the prize "Qızıl dərviş" ("The Golden Dervish").
- 2011 – the order "Şöhrət" ("Glory").
