= 1927 in Portugal =

- Decades: 1900s; 1910s; 1920s; 1930s; 1940s
- See also: History of Portugal; Timeline of Portuguese history; List of years in Portugal

Events in the year 1927 in Portugal.

== Incumbents ==
- President: Óscar Carmona
- Prime Minister: Óscar Carmona (Independent)

== Events ==
- April - Establishment of the Order of Public Instruction

== Sport ==
- 22 January - Establishment of the Portuguese Chess Federation
- 20 March - Establishment of S.L. Benfica (basketball)
- 12 June - Campeonato de Portugal Final
- 17 August - Establishment of the Federação Portuguesa de Basquetebol
- Establishment of the Federação Portuguesa de Vela
- Establishment of F.C. Marco
- Establishment of the Volta a Portugal
- Establishment of the Falperra International Hill Climb

== Births ==
- 24 February - David Mourão-Ferreira, writer, poet (died 1996)
- 1 March - Ruy de Carvalho, actor
- 10 March - Raúl Figueiredo, footballer
- 9 April - Francisco Rocha, footballer
- 30 June - António Jonet, modern pentathlete (died 2007)
- 26 July - Matateu, footballer (died 2000)
- 27 July - Adelaide João, actress (died 2021)
- 27 August - António Reis, film director, screenwriter, producer, poet, sculptor, ethnographer (died 1991)
- 29 August - Bentes, footballer (d. 2003)
- 3 September - João Baptista Martins, footballer (died 1993)
- 8 December - José Manuel de Mello, businessman (died 2009)
- Carlos Montez Melancia, Governor of Macau (d. 2022)
- Francisco Martins Rodrigues, anti-Fascist resistant (died 2008)
- Lima de Freitas, painter, illustrator, ceramicist, writer (died 1998)
- Luísa Dacosta, writer (d. 2015)
- Manuel Cargaleiro, artist

== Deaths ==
- 15 June - Manuel António Lino, medic, politician, poet, dramatist (born 1865)
- 21 September - José Maria de Sousa Horta e Costa, soldier, politician, diplomat (born 1858)
- 11 October - Miguel, Duke of Braganza, Miguelist claimant to the throne of Portugal (born 1853)
- 15 October - Lucrécia de Arriaga, First Lady of Portugal (born 1844)
- João Marques de Oliveira, painter (born 1853)
