= 2009 in Portugal =

- Decades: 1980s; 1990s; 2000s; 2010s; 2020s
- See also: History of Portugal; Timeline of Portuguese history; List of years in Portugal

Events in the year 2009 in Portugal.

== Incumbents ==
- President: Aníbal Cavaco Silva
- Prime Minister: José Sócrates (Socialist)

== Events ==
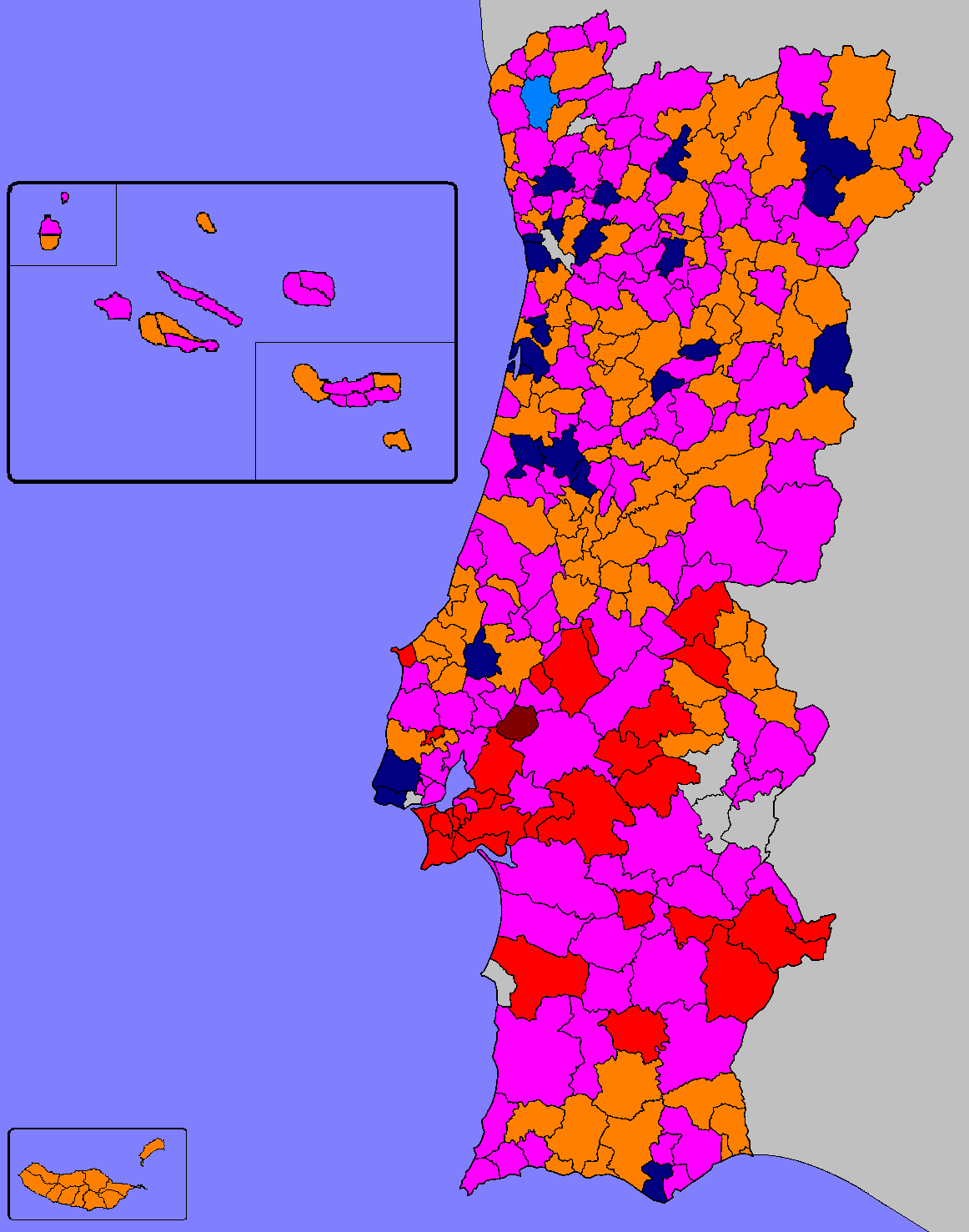
Summary of the Portuguese local elections. Municipalities won by: ■ - PSD: 117 ■ - PS: 132 ■ - CDU: 28 ■ - BE: 1 ■ - CDS–PP: 1 ■ - PSD coalitions: 22 ■ - Independents: 7

- May 2009 to early 2010 – A flu pandemic resulted in 122 deaths in Portugal.
- 7 June – 2009 European Parliament election
- 27 September – 2009 Portuguese legislative election
- 11 October – 2009 Portuguese local elections

== Arts and entertainment ==
- To Die Like a Man, a Portuguese drama film directed by João Pedro Rodrigues.
- In music: Portugal in the Eurovision Song Contest 2009.

== Sports ==
Football (soccer) competitions: Primeira Liga, Liga de Honra, Taça da Liga, Taça de Portugal.

== Deaths ==
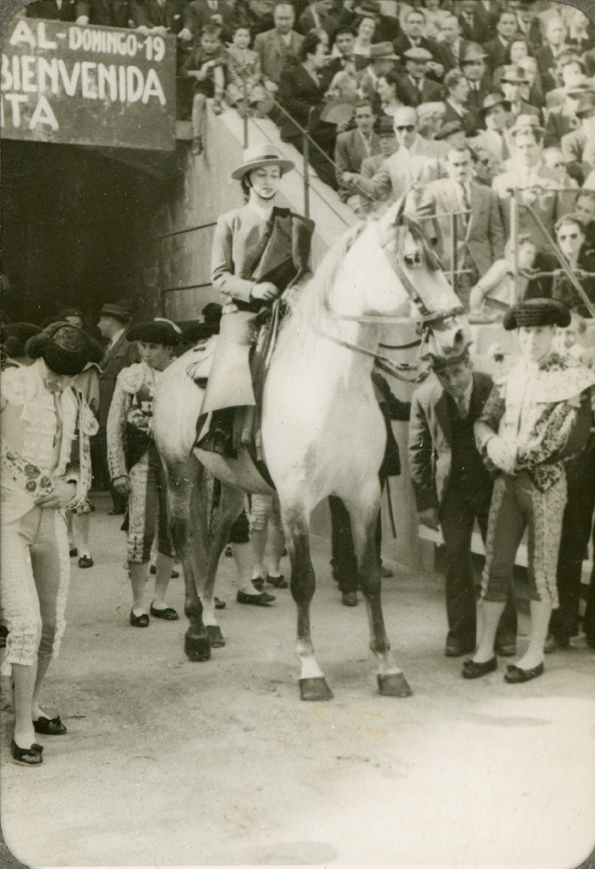
Conchita Cintrón

- 26 January – Fernando Amaral, politician (b. 1925).
- 3 February – António dos Reis Rodrigues, Roman Catholic Bishop (b. 1918)
- 17 February – Conchita Cintrón, Chile-born Peruvian torera (female bullfighter), died in Lisbon (born 1922)
- 11 May – António Lopes dos Santos, army general and colonial administrator (b. 1919).
- 25 May – Tomás Paquete, Olympic sprinter (b. 1923).
- 17 June – José Calvário, songwriter (b. 1951).
- 27 July – Edite Soeiro, journalist (b. 1934).
- 8 August – Raul Solnado, actor and comedian (b. 1929)
- 24 November – Gonçalves Isabelinha, footballer (b. 1908)

== See also ==
- List of Portuguese films of 2009
