= List of Portuguese films of the 2000s =

A list of films produced in Portugal in the 2010s, ordered by year of release. For an alphabetical list of Portuguese films see Category:Portuguese films.

== 2000 ==
- List of Portuguese films of 2000

== 2001 ==
- List of Portuguese films of 2001

== 2002 ==
- List of Portuguese films of 2002

== 2003 ==
- List of Portuguese films of 2003

== 2004 ==
- List of Portuguese films of 2004

== 2005 ==
- List of Portuguese films of 2005

== 2006 ==
- List of Portuguese films of 2006

== 2007 ==
- List of Portuguese films of 2007

== 2008 ==
- List of Portuguese films of 2008

== 2009 ==
- List of Portuguese films of 2009
