= 1931 in Portugal =

- Decades: 1910s; 1920s; 1930s; 1940s; 1950s
- See also: History of Portugal; Timeline of Portuguese history; List of years in Portugal

Events in the year 1931 in Portugal.

== Incumbents ==
- President: Óscar Carmona
- Prime Minister: Domingos Oliveira (National Union)

== Events ==
- Madeira uprising
- Establishment of Avante!

== Arts and entertainment ==
=== Films ===
- Douro, Faina Fluvial
- A Severa

== Sport ==
- Establishment of C.D. Arrifanense
- Establishment of F.C. Famalicão

== Births ==
- 16 February - Paulo Alexandre, singer
- 8 March - Pires, footballer
- 5 July - António de Macedo, filmmaker, writer, university professor, lecturer (died 2017)
- 1 August - Isabel de Castro, actress (died 2005)
- 13 September - Mário Torres, footballer (died 2020)
- 15 September - José Pereira, footballer

== Deaths ==
- 24 August - Henrique Lopes de Mendonça, poet, playwright, naval officer (born 1856)
