= 2010 in Portugal =

- Decades: 1990s; 2000s; 2010s; 2020s; 2030s
- See also: History of Portugal; Timeline of Portuguese history; List of years in Portugal

The following lists events that happened during 2010 in Portugal.

== Incumbents ==
- President: Aníbal Cavaco Silva
- Prime Minister: José Sócrates (Socialist)

== Events ==
=== June ===
- 5 June – Same-sex marriage became legal.

=== November ===
- 24 November; During the 2010 Portuguese general strike, an estimated 3 million workers refused to work. An estimated 80% of trains did not run.

=== December ===
- Portuguese Natural Gas Association is founded.

== Arts and entertainment ==
- In music: Portugal in the Eurovision Song Contest 2010.
- Portuguese electronic band Sensible Soccers were formed near Porto

== Sports ==
Football (soccer) competitions: Primeira Liga, Liga de Honra, Taça da Liga, Taça de Portugal.

== Deaths ==
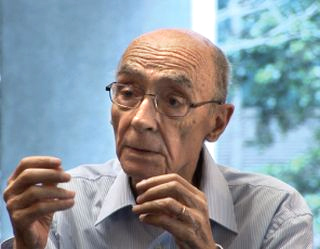
José Saramago

- 9 January – Acúrsio Carrelo, footballer (born 1931).
- 18 december – José Saramago, novelist, poet, playwright, journalist and Nobel laureate, (born 1922)
- 25 July – Vasco de Almeida e Costa, naval officer and politician (born 1932)

== See also ==
- List of Portuguese films of 2010
