= 1932 in Portugal =

- Decades: 1910s; 1920s; 1930s; 1940s; 1950s
- See also: History of Portugal; Timeline of Portuguese history; List of years in Portugal

Events in the year 1932 in Portugal.

== Incumbents ==
- President: Óscar Carmona
- Prime Minister: Domingos Oliveira (National Union) (until 5 July); António de Oliveira Salazar (National Union) (from 5 July)

== Events ==
- António de Oliveira Salazar is appointed as Prime Minister of Portugal, would establish the Estado Novo in 1933

== Sports ==
- S.C. Esmoriz founded
- C.F. Estrela da Amadora founded

== Births ==
- 11 January – Eduardo Barbeiro, swimmer. (d. 2022)
- 31 May – António Tavares, sports shooter.
- 2 July – Dinis Vital, footballer (d. 2014)
- 26 July – Vasco de Almeida e Costa, naval officer and politician (died in 2010)
- 2 November – António Barbosa de Melo, lawyer and politician (d. 2016).
- 21 November – Domiciano Cavém, footballer (d. 2005 in Portugal)
- 23 December – Germano de Figueiredo, footballer (d. 2004).

== Deaths ==
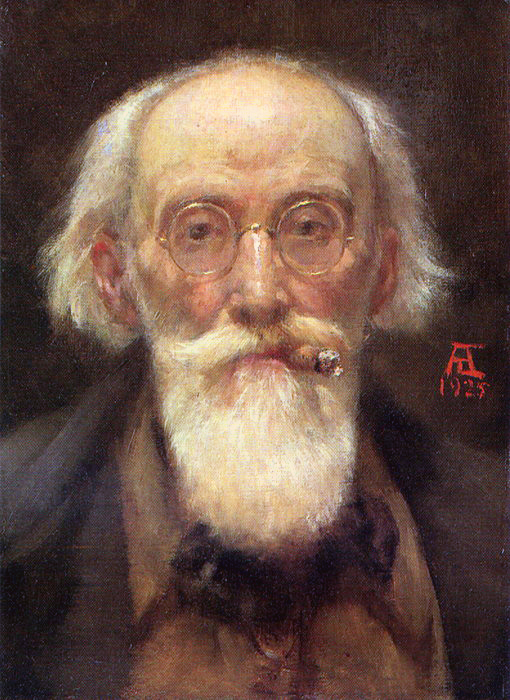
Artur Loureiro

- 7 July – Artur Loureiro, painter (b. 1853).
