= A Ilha dos Escravos =

2008 film directed by Francisco Manso

- Directed by: Francisco Manso
- Written by: Carla Baptista; Fernando Vendrell
- Produced by: Luís Alvarães; Isabel Silva
- Starring: Vanessa Giácomo; Ângelo Torres; Diogo Infante
- Cinematography: Luís Correia
- Edited by: Pedro Ribeiro; Sandro Aguilar
- Music by: Nuno Canavarro
- Release date: May 8, 2008 (Brazil)
- Running time: 100 minutes
- Countries: Cape Verde; Brazil; Portugal; Spain
- Language: Portuguese

A Ilha dos Escravos (The Island of Slaves or The Isle of Slaves) is a 2008 Cape Verdean, Brazilian, Portuguese and Spanish drama film directed by Portuguese director Francisco Manso. It was based on a novel named "O Escravo" ("The Slave") written in 1856 by José Evaristo de Almeida, a Portuguese who was exiled in Cape Verde.

== Plot ==
The film takes place during the 19th century during a revolt by Miguelists who were exiled in Cape Verde, and centres on a love triangle between Maria (Vanessa Giácomo), João (Ângelo Torres) and Albano Lopes (Diogo Infante). Maria is the daughter of a farmer, João is a slave and Albano Lopes is a Miguelist official. A troop survey of the city of Praia, instigated by officers banished in the archipelago, as a result of a defeat of the partisans by Infante D. Miguel during the Portuguese Civil War, and a historic part of the film. The rebels, contrary to their own anti-liberal convictions, try to enlist the slaved population into their field, in the absence of other human means that embodies the designs.

== Cast ==
Actor/Actress	Role
Vanessa Giácomo	Maria
Ângelo Torres	João
Diogo Infante	Albano Lopes
Zezé Motta	Júlia
Milton Gonçalves	Tesoura
João Lagarto	Boaventura
Vítor Norte	Manuel Sampaio
José Eduardo	Gouveia
Josina Fortes	Luísa
Filipe Porto	Rezosa
Francisco de Assis	Sargento Cláudio
Luís Évora	Enok
Luís Gaspar	Jerónimo Pimentel
Elba Silva	Julia (jovem)
Francisco de Souza	Pai Leonel
Susana Vieira	Branca Nina Magalhães

== See also ==
- Cinema of Cape Verde
- List of Brazilian films of 2008
- List of Portuguese films of the 2000s
- List of Spanish films of the 2000s
