= List of Portuguese films of 2009 =

A list of Portuguese films that were first released in 2009.

| Release date | Title | Director | Cast | Genre | Notes | Ref |
|---|---|---|---|---|---|---|
| January 15 | Contract | Nicolau Breyner | | | 45,379 admissions | |
| January 15 | Poison Heals | Raquel Freire | | | 2,552 admissions | |
| January 29 | Second Life | Miguel Gaudêncio | | | 90,186 admissions | |
| March 19 | True and Tender Is the North/ The Northern Land | João Botelho | Ana Moreira | | 2,780 admissions | |
| April 23 | Doomed Love | Mário Barroso | | | 5,109 admissions | |
| April 23 | April Showers | Ivo M. Ferreira | | | | |
| April 30 | Salazar, A Vida Privada | Jorge Queiroga | | | 2.603 admissions | |
| April 30 | Eccentricities of a Blonde-haired Girl | Manoel de Oliveira | Ricardo Trêpa, Catarina Wallenstein | | 6,104 admissions | |
| May 7 | Uprise | Sandro Aguilar | | | 628 admissions | |
| May 7 | As Operações SAAL | João Dias | | Documentary | 1,783 admissions | |
| May 18 | The Last Hanging | Francisco Manso | | | 2,388 admissions | |
| June 4 | Star Crossed | Mark Heller | | | 12,419 admissions | |
| August 20 | 4 Hearts | Manuel Mozos | | | 2,282 admissions | |
| September 17 | Arena | João Salaviza | | | 15,294 admissions; Short Film Palm d'Or at Cannes | |
| September 17 | A Esperança Está Onde Menos Se Espera | Joaquim Leitão | | | 40,675 admissions | |
| September 18 | To Die Like a Man | João Pedro Rodrigues | | | 5,842 admissions | |
| November 12 | Os Sorrisos do Destino | Fernando Lopes | | | 2,316 admissions | |
| November 19 | Ne Change Rien | Pedro Costa | Jeanne Balibar | Documentary | 2,141 admissions | |
| December 3 | Uma Aventura na Casa Assombrada | Carlos Coelho da Silva | | | 103,995 admissions | |

== See also ==
- 2009 in Portugal
