= 2008 in Portugal =

- Decades: 1980s; 1990s; 2000s; 2010s; 2020s
- See also: History of Portugal; Timeline of Portuguese history; List of years in Portugal

Events in the year 2008 in Portugal.

== Incumbents ==
- President: Aníbal Cavaco Silva
- Prime Minister: José Sócrates (Socialist)

== Arts and entertainment ==
In music: Portugal in the Eurovision Song Contest 2008.

=== Film ===
- From Now On released in Portugal.

== Sports ==
Football (soccer) competitions: Primeira Liga, Liga de Honra, Taça da Liga, Taça de Portugal.

== Deaths ==
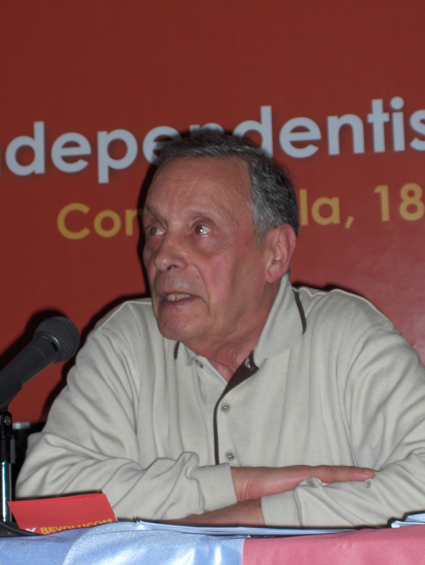
Francisco Martins Rodrigues

- 3 January – Antônio Matias, judoka (born 1963).
- 21 February – Madalena Barbosa, feminist (b. 1942).
- 20 March – Carlos Galvão de Melo, military officer and politician (born 1921)
- 22 April – Francisco Martins Rodrigues, anti-Fascist resistant (b. 1927)

== See also ==
- List of Portuguese films of 2008
