= Sensible Soccers =

Portuguese electronic band

- Origin: Portugal
- Genres: Hypnagogic pop, electronic, psychedelic, pop, math rock, post-rock, shoegaze, chillwave, Balearica, prog-rock, Afro house
- Years active: 2010–present
- Labels: AMDISCS: Futures Reserve Label, PAD, Groovement, Wasser Bassin
- Members: Hugo Alfredo Gomes; Manuel Justo (Né); André Simão Reis; Sérgio Freitas
- Past members: Filipe Azevedo; Emanuel Botelho
- Website: sensiblesoccers.bandcamp.com

Sensible Soccers are a Portuguese electronic band who formed in the Porto region of Northern Portugal in 2010. The band are named after Sensible Soccer, a football video game that was popular in the early 1990s. As of 2026, the band is composed of four members, and have released five full-length albums.

The band's first EP was released in 2011. Since then, they have played concerts in bars (such as Bar Labranza in Meiro, Galicia), and cultural associations to international events such as the Primavera Club, Paredes de Coura Festival and the first Portuguese edition of Boiler Room. According to Revista RUA, the band managed to assert themselves on the national music scene "through the internet", as a "rare success story that is not based on great promotion or dissemination strategies", and are a "living illustration of how in a rich and bustling musical circuit, but with market dimensions proportional to the size of the country, a cult status (can be) achieved."

The band compose and rehearse their music in the rural village of Fornelo, situated in the municipality of Vila do Conde, north of Porto city. They have often been referred to as a 'cult band'.

== History ==
=== Background ===
Original bandmembers Hugo Alfredo Gomes and Manuel Justo (Né) are from the municipality of Vila do Conde, whereas the other two original members (since departed), Emanuel Botelho and Filipe Azevedo, are from the neighbouring city of São João da Madeira. Gomes and Justo were teenage friends in their locality, as were Botelho and Azevedo in theirs. Gomes met Botelho in the city of Coimbra, and began playing music together at the "public service entity" of Rádio Universidade de Coimbra (RUC). As explained in an interview with the Portuguese newspaper Público, eventually, the two pairs of friends joined together, becoming Sensible Soccers:

"We've existed as a band more or less seriously since 2010 — but the idea came from 2008 and the name was already chosen. Hugo had started playing with the computer, made some demos and asked me to add basses and guitars. As Filipe had a studio in the Centro Comercial Stop (Stop Shopping Centre) [in Porto], we started rehearsing there and ended up in a quartet."

The band were formed in 2010, and initially rehearsed in the Mercado na Invicta shopping centre in Porto. The four had "known each other for a few years" before starting Sensible Soccers, and had been linked to other musical projects together in the past. Beginning initially as a trio, the group played their first concert at the Armazém do Chá live-music venue in Porto on 24 April 2011. They subsequently became a quartet - in which format they went on to create their first two EPs and first full-length album, before reverting to a trio once more.

=== Sensible Soccers EP ===
In October 2011, the band released their self-titled EP on cassette, owing to the medium's nostalgia factor, but also considering how cheaply it was to produce. That same year, songs from the first EP were performed by the band at the Passos Manuel bar, Porto. According to music magazine Revista RUA, "The sound they presented from the beginning was different; a real stone in the pond in what was the music scene in Portugal at the time."

Writing about the band's transition from rehearsing in the Mercado na Invicta to the village of Fornelo in 2016, the Portuguese online magazine Rimas e Batidas wrote:

Leaving the Invicta rehearsal rooms took them to the Fornelo retreat and brought them physical involvement with the compositions. "Before, we used to make songs of a minute and a half: 'It's good like this, let's smoke!'", laughs Hugo. In the parish of Vila do Conde, where Hugo Gomes lives, "in a big house", the clock seems to have other speeds. "We can stay there sleeping and everything. That time to do things, plus the time that is less accelerated than city time, certainly marks us", considers Manuel.

Speaking to the Portuguese magazine Máxima in 2019, Hugo Gomes recounted how at the start of the band "we started to give concerts all over the country and enter the festival circuit and the normal lineups of Portuguese bands". The band expressed their desire to one day fill the Estádio dos Arcos, a stadium in their home village of Vila do Conde which can accommodate 12,815 people.

=== 2013 developments ===
2013 marked an important year for the band, as they performed in February at the inaugural Portuguese Boiler Room event, attaining some international exposure. According to bandmember Hugo Alfredo Gomes, their appearance "opened a lot of doors for us and generated some buzz around the band, especially in the following weeks", and as a result of it they were also hired to perform at a wedding in Madeira. Also in 2013, the band's 10-minute single "Sofrendo Por Você" (Suffering For You) took the form of an "instant pop classic" in Portugal that summer, according to Galeria Zé dos Bois. A music video was produced for the track, consisting of a fixed shot in front of an abandoned factory near Fornelo, in which "a bunch of strange men begin, one by one, dancing in the weirdest way imaginable." The men dancing were friends of the band. Following the single's success, enthusiasm surrounding the band further increased and the band signed to Czech publisher AMDISCS.

In late 2013, promoting their upcoming debut album "8", the band expressed in an interview their intention to "grow in a sustained way on the national scene, and to pave the way outside Portugal. The desire for internationalization is something in which we have tried to invest, and we believe that with this new album some doors can be opened in that sense."

=== Twin Turbo ===
In January 2014, the track "Twin Turbo" was used in a video on Cristiano Ronaldo's official Facebook account, celebrating his recent winning of the 2013 FIFA Ballon d'Or. The video was watched more than 5.5 million times in 40 hours. The band had previously expressed in an interview that they were "fervent admirers of President Ronaldo."

=== 8 ===
The album "8" was released in February 2014 and was well-received, attaining some 'Record of the Year' awards in their home country. Some fans were left "astonished" however as to why the single "Sofrendo Por Você", then the band's biggest hit, was not included on the album, but as the band explained to Público:

"Some people think we didn't put the song on the record out of a tantrum in reaction to the recognition it had, and I know it's strange that it was left out, but it was never planned to be on the album. In fact, the mere fact that it exists is almost a miracle: we started it two and a half years ago, we gave it many turns and when we finally found a record that we liked we put it out. But at that time the album was already recorded", they justify.

As with their first EP, the band chose to edit and release the album "8" on cassette, "revitalizing a format that was on the verge of death" according to bandmember Emanuel Botelho. Botelho noted that they, as well as "many more people in the last 3-4 years", had opted for a cassette release owing partly to its cheapness of production:

"The cassette edition has that nostalgic charge you talk about, but it also has a very important practical side: it's extremely cheap to produce. This also allows it to be accessible to the public, and the question of many people already not being able to play cassettes is a bit fallacious: in fact, those who buy physical formats, whatever those formats are, will still listen to the digital version in the overwhelming majority of times, for convenience. The purchase of physical formats is increasingly associated with the logic of collecting..."

The number '8' was chosen as the album title due to the band "lik(ing) the idea of the name of the record being a number/symbol", and also due to the fact that the album contains eight tracks. When asked about the meaning behind some of the song titles, Botelho responded: "Throughout the album the idea of tribute is present. Nikopol is a comic book character, Dibo is an Ivorian star from Rio Ave (football club) and Ulrike is a left-wing political activist behind a revolutionary movement in Germany in the late 60s, early 70s. The other songs are also people or characters. And a cat." Bandmember Hugo Alfredo Gomes noted that "the album is to be listened to at home, with headphones or stretched out on a sofa looking at some speakers. This is how we imagine the listening of 8."

Speaking to a journalist in July 2014, the band mused on their music making process at the time:

"We arrived in search of a way to present our songs live. We have a lot of material limitations and not only that, so the initial phase was noisier, dirtier. For "8" we had friends who lent us material seriously and the result was different. We have been evolving and Filipe together with João Moreira has been producing and polishing our live sound until this moment. Aesthetically, we walk through areas that please the four (of us). Although we like different things, we touch each other in points. We all have a taste for repetition, for example. The themes end up showing that our influences are very varied and poorly defined. We are not a genre band."

In summer 2014, prior to the annual FUSING Culture Experience cultural festival in the Portuguese city of Figueira da Foz, the band stated in an interview that they "were thinking of releasing some pigeons before the concert started", adding that it was the first time they had ever performed on a beach. They also appeared at Boom Festival that same year, and played concerts outside of the Iberian Peninsula. Sometime after the release of 8, founding member and bassist Emanuel Botelho left the band (due to "incompatibilities with his personal life"), and was replaced by bassist André Simão, who had already participated in the group's first albums.

In February 2015, Portuguese music magazine Altamont chose 'AFG' as its song of the day.

=== Villa Soledade ===
In February 2016, the band released their second album Villa Soledade, named after a house situated on the main road between the towns of Fornelo and Trofa which the owner had decorated with monuments, statues and figures as a tribute to his dead son. Commenting on the minimalist design of the album cover, online magazine Arte Factos noted it as "one of the best artworks of recent times, a clear revival of the potential of Office 98", also noting that the music on the album overall was "less dark" than that of its predecessor "8". In October 2016, the band supported English band The Comet Is Coming at a concert in Musicbox, Lisbon.

In 2017, after the tour in support of the album Villa Soledade, founding member and guitarist Filipe Azevedo also departed the band, leaving them as a trio. After the departure of Azevedo, "the bass became the main voice," according to Gomes, "responsible for the melodic lines that were (previously) made by the guitar with another texture."

In July 2017, French music magazine Les Inrockuptibles highlighted the band's performance at that month's Super Bock Super Rock festival in Lisbon as "One of the most fascinating discoveries of the weekend", adding that with "neither a singer nor a leader to captivate the audience: a guitar, a bass and a multitude of synths, the band accompanies the sunset with its layers and takes us into a universe with airy and heady modular melodies."

Describing the evolution of the band's sound as of 2018, the digital magazine Europavox wrote:

Each composition penned by Sensible Soccers has its weight, having no problem in going well beyond the four-minute mark and becoming a progressive mellow trip. If the first projects went for the post-rock chillwave trend, then their latest, Villa Soledade, takes that exploration further, incorporating funky basslines, African rhythms or krautrock influences in a seamless manner.

=== Aurora ===
The band spent a year and a half making their next record, Aurora, which was released in March 2019. The band changed their working method on Aurora, enlisting an external producer in B Fachada explaining, "it was very important to have an external voice that looked at the songs with some distance and had pertinent opinions about them."

The album was partly recorded in December 2018 at the Casa do Soto artistic residency in Barcelinhos, Arouca and was noted as consisting of a more upbeat mood than the band's previous work, while still harbouring their trademark themes of nostalgia. As bandmember Hugo Alfredo Gomes told the magazine Máxima, "This time we thought of calling the album Aurora (..) a little because it conveyed the idea of a new beginning but also of dawn. And if until now our discography was more grey and melancholic, this one was more in a good mood."

Gomes dedicated the album to the memory of his mother. In the track Fenómeno de Refracção, sound clips of Portuguese people being interviewed about "the supposed 1999 Algarve tsunami" are used, and the online magazine Arte Factos drew similarities between one other track to the work of Portuguese singer-songwriter José Afonso. Clash magazine reviewed the album positively in March 2019, and Rimas e Batidas noted it as "an ambitious step into a new dimension that exponentially expands the sonic possibilities of Sensible Soccers."

The album art for Aurora consisted of a collage of artwork snippets by David Hockney, Félix Del Marle (fr) and Franz Erhard Walther.

As of April 2019, the band's concert performances were augmented by the inclusion of Sérgio Freitas (keyboards and synthesizers) and Jorge "Cientista" Carvalho (percussion). Carvalho's percussion "accentuated the more exotic side of the band's sonic universe" in 2019, according to Rimas e Batidas, "thus highlighting the syncopations that differentiate Sensible Soccers' latest project from the rest of their work." In January 2020, the band played at the Eurosonic Noorderslag music showcase festival in Groningen, the Netherlands.

=== Fornelo Tapes Vol. 2 ===
In 2021, while in lockdown due to the COVID-19 pandemic, the band took part in a project named Esfera, "directed and curated by André Tentugal and Henrique Amaro", in which they collaborated with Carlos Maria Trindade, keyboardist with the Portuguese band Madredeus, to create an original piece of music. This track, along with another, were later released as Fornelo Tapes Vol. 2 in 2022.

=== Manoel ===
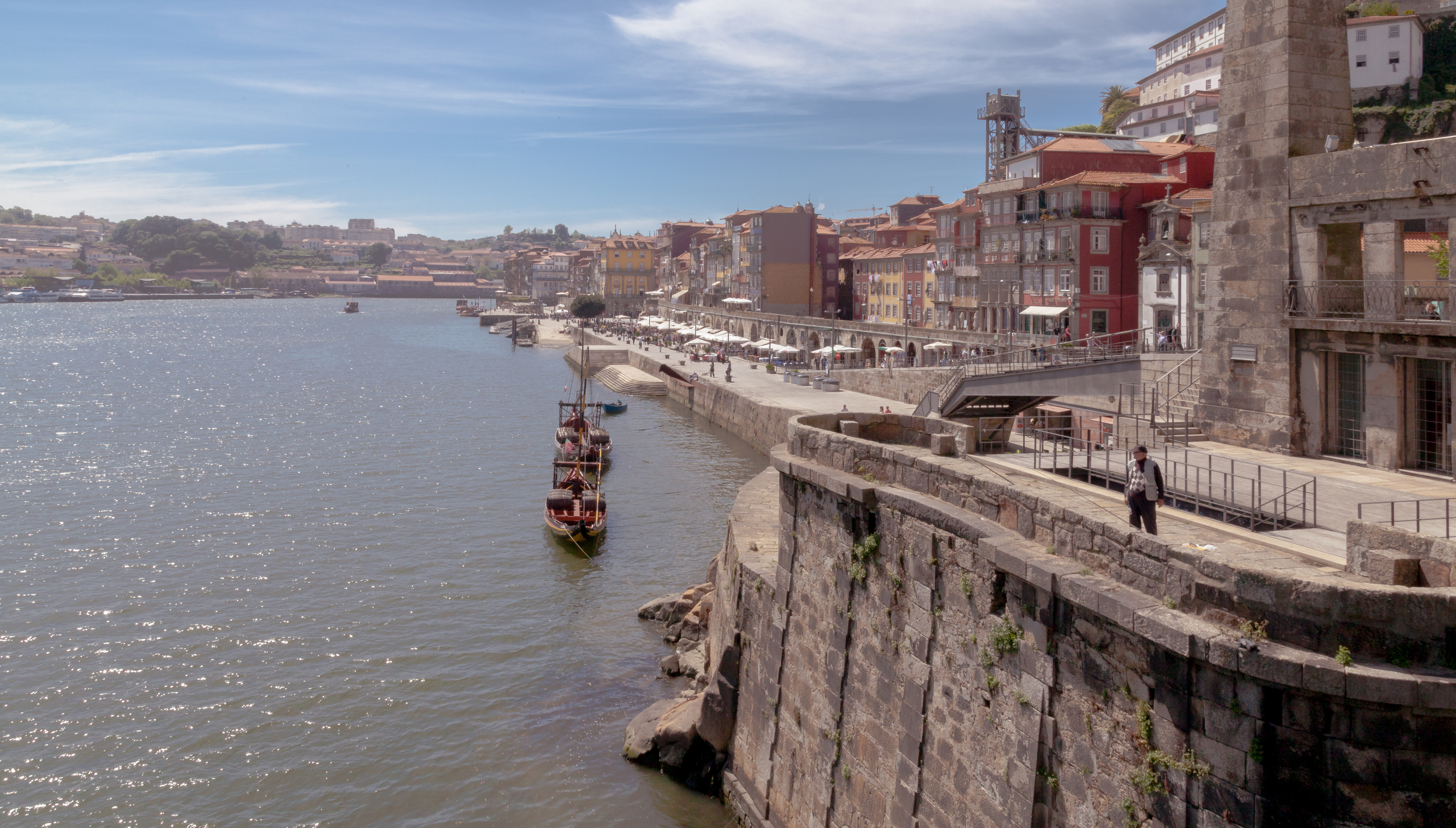
The city of Porto, river Douro and films of Manoel de Oliveira inspired the album Manoel (2021)

Also in 2021, the band "fulfilled their long-held wish" to create an original soundtrack for the 1931 silent film "Douro, Faina Fluvial", which coincided with the 90th anniversary of its release. The film is a portrait of the city of Porto and was the debut film of director Manoel de Oliveira. Along with de Oliveira's 1956 film "O Pintor e a Cidade", which also focuses on Porto, the band created a project named 'Manoel', creating music to accompany the two films in tandem, which resulted in the LP Manoel released in 2021, recorded at Arda Recorders. Reviewing the album, Portuguese magazine Altamont wrote that while "Manoel may not be as "epic" in its pathos as "8", nor as danceable as Aurora" it was still an "impeccable Sensible Soccers album."

In September 2021, the band premiered the music live alongside a screening of the two films at the Casa do Cinema at the Serralves Museum in Porto. In February 2022, the band performed the same again in Lisbon, including some additional tracks which were not included on the album.

=== Camminando di Notte ===
From 2023 to 2026, the band took a break from performing live, but in 2024 began work on their fifth album Camminando di Notte. The release of the album was preceded by the release of two remix EPs in early 2026 of the album tracks reinterpreted by other artists including Mad Professor, Danilo Plessow (aka Motor City Drum Ensemble), Peaking Lights and Tolouse Low Trax. That summer, the band played at Jameson Common Ground in Casa Capitão, Lisbon, as well as at Primavera Sound Porto held in Porto's Parque da Cidade.

The album of tracks in their original form was finally released on 25 September 2026 with an accompanying concert at Teatro Circo, Braga that evening.

=== Future ===
Bandmember Hugo Alfredo Gomes mused on the future of the band in a 2019 interview, noting how "One of the most important things for us is that our music continues to be relevant, to make itself heard, and to have artistic validity. This is fundamental, and when this is over, the band will also end."

== Band members ==
- Hugo Alfredo Gomes: synthesizers, keyboards, drum machine, programming and vocals
- Manuel Justo: synthesizers, keyboards and vocals
- André Simão: bass, synthesizers, keyboards, percussion, drums and vocals
- Sérgio Freitas
- João Nuno Vilaça (features during live performances)

== Style of music ==
The band themselves have noted that they do not consider themselves a 'genre band' as such, but admit that they share pop sensibilities. When asked in 2013 to what extent their rural background influenced their music style, the band replied that "Rurality is the environment where we find ourselves to work, and it influences us in ways that are not very visible."

Touching upon the band's influences in 2016, the Portuguese website Rimas e Batidas noted:

The references can range from Pink Floyd, at the time of the experimentalism of albums like Meddle, but also from Portuguese popular music, from the memories of dance songs in the villages with an organ player on top of the crowd of a tractor or an open box van, firing all kinds of instruments in MIDI format or singing into microphones full of echoes. "Exactly! We have a particular taste for that 'parolice'", confesses Manuel (Justo). "I mean, I don't know if it's cheesy or not, but from the influences of kids there were also memories of the songs on car trips with their parents, or the Prefab Sprout cassettes that their aunt had in the car. That stayed. But certainly other things more of the moment and others more timeless came together."

According to the online music magazine Resident Advisor, the band make "mostly instrumental music, with a wide range of musical approaches, which are sometimes more ambient-oriented, with thickly-layered synths, guitars masterfully work wrapping the arrangements, in an inventive-yet-coherent way but also bringing us thumping beats that range from shy wink to the dance floor, to the fragile emotional down-tempo."

Jeffpresents, a UK promoter, described the style of the band's music in promotional material from around the year 2014: "The sound of the band is not easy to categorise but psychedelia and shoegaze are two of the "labels" that could be applied. They don't try to hide their taste for pop melodies but the construction of their songs goes far beyond the traditional with progressive structures and arrangements. Their live shows have an extra energy and intensity that will surprise and excite even those who already enjoy their recorded work."

Les Inrockuptibles, reviewing the album Villa Soledade in 2016 noted "There are seven tracks of a rock that is a little mathematical, a little psychedelicated, entirely instrumental and this time augmented by a voracious appetite for trance, which at times looks towards haunting Afro-house sounds – these are the best passages of the record."

Writing of the band in the 2010s, the Portuguese website Rimas e Batidas noted that they take "nostalgia and melancholy to a danceable and often pop plane" and are "endowed with an ability to create spacious environments through synthesizers, reverberated guitars and minimalist beats, in an exploratory sound with timbral and harmonic games."

Speaking in 2019, bandmember Manuel Justo told JornalismoPortoNet "We compose things, but they are Sensible Soccers. I have no idea why this is the case. We didn't invent anything, but we put together many sub-genres of things in one and in the end we put on top a sauce that is ours and that gives an air of Sensible Soccers at the end. It will have to do with the harmonies, the dynamics of the progressions."

== Discography ==
=== LPs ===
- 8 (2014)
- Villa Soledade (2016)
- Aurora (2019)
- Manoel (2021)
- Camminando di Notte (2026)

=== EPs ===
- Sensible Soccers EP (2011)

=== Singles ===
- "Drunk In The Sky" (2011)
- "Sofrendo Por Você" (2013)
- "Elias Katana" (2019)
- "Cantiga da Ponte" (2021)
- "Barreira Invisível" (2022)

=== Compilations ===
- Fornelo Tapes Vol. 1 (2012)
- 2011-2013 (2021)

=== Live soundtrack performances ===
- Music set to a compilation/montage of archival football footage curated and assembled by Portuguese audiovisual artist Pedro Maia (as part of the 22nd Vila do Conde International Film Festival, 2014)
- "Paulo" by Laetitia Morais (as part of the Vila do Conde Short Film Festival at GNRation's Black Box, Braga, 2015)
- "Man with a Movie Camera" (as part of the Famalicão Film Festival, 2017)
- "Douro, Faina Fluvial" and "O Pintor e a Cidade" (2022)

=== Collaborations ===
- Fornelo Tapes Vol. 2, with Carlos Maria Trindade (2022)
- EP#1 – Dub Versions with Mad Professor (May 2026)
- EP#2 – The Remixes with Danilo Plessow, Peaking Lights and Tolouse Low Trax (2026)
