= 2005 in Portugal =

- Decades: 1980s; 1990s; 2000s; 2010s; 2020s
- See also: History of Portugal; Timeline of Portuguese history; List of years in Portugal

Events in the year 2005 in Portugal.

== Incumbents ==
- President: Jorge Sampaio
- Prime Minister: Pedro Santana Lopes (Social Democratic) (until 12 March); José Sócrates (Socialist) (from 12 March)

== Events ==
=== January to March ===
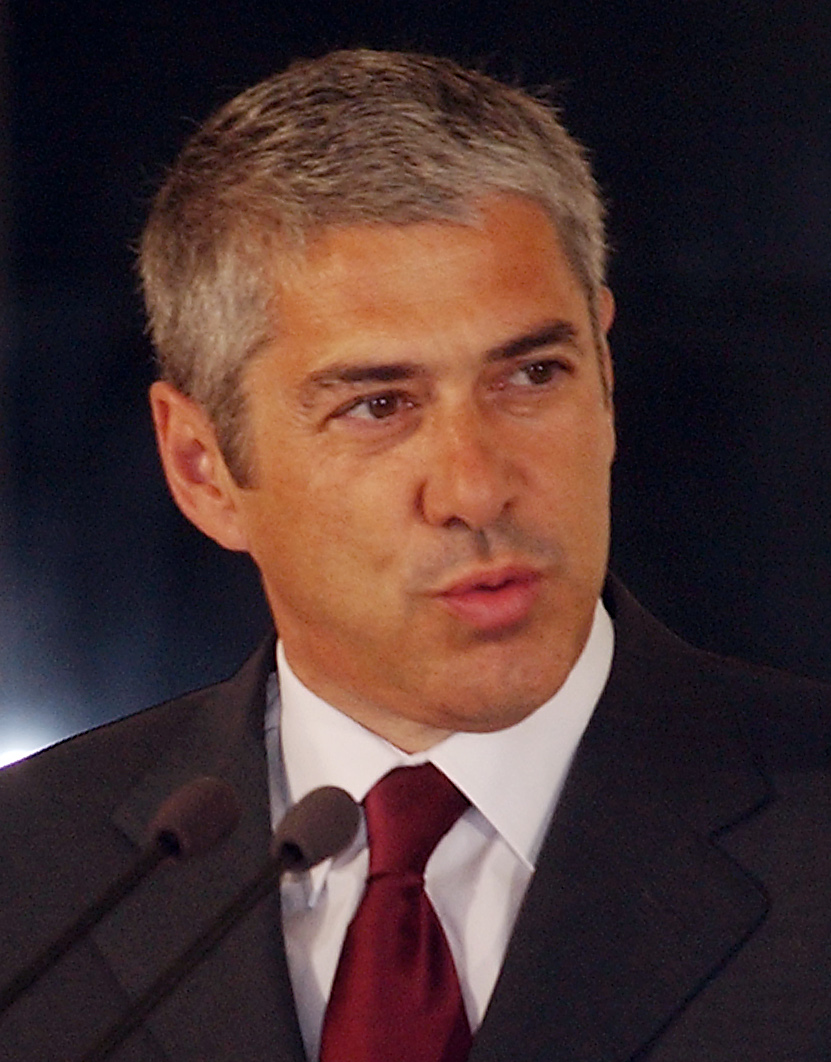
12 March: José Sócrates becomes Prime Minister after leading the Socialist Party to victory in the 20 February parliamentary election

- 11 January – The government confirms that the Portuguese mission to Iraq, which has consisted of 120 police officers stationed in the southeastern city of Nasiriyah since November 2003, will end as planned on 12 February.
- 20 February – Legislative election: The Socialist Party led by José Sócrates wins a majority of seats in the Assembly with 45.0% of the vote, the party's best ever result in a national election. The Social Democratic Party of outgoing Prime Minister Pedro Santana Lopes receives 28.8% of the vote, a drop of 11.5% from the previous election in 2002. Turnout increases to 63.6%, reversing a declining trend in voter participation observed since the election in 1980.
- 12 March – José Sócrates is sworn in as the new prime minister of Portugal in a ceremony held at the Assembly of the Republic.

=== April to June ===
- 17 April – In motor racing, Brazil's Alex Barros wins the 2005 Portuguese motorcycle Grand Prix held at the Circuito do Estoril.
- 22 May – In association football, Benfica wins the 2004–05 Primeira Liga, the club's first league title for eleven years.
- 25 May – Prime Minister José Socrates introduces a series of tax rises designed to limit the country's expanding budget deficit, which this year is forecast to reach than double the accepted limit for Eurozone countries. Among the changes are higher levies on fuel and tobacco, an increase in the top rate of VAT from 19% to 21%, and a one-time income tax rise to those earning more than €60,000 per year.
- 29 May – In association football, Vitória de Setúbal defeats Benfica by a score of 2–1 to win the final of the Taça de Portugal. It the first time the club has won the tournament in 38 years.
- 6 June – With river levels falling amid the country's worst drought in 60 years, the government requests €6 million in compensation from Spain after accusing the Spanish authorities of over-extracting water from the Douro river upstream of Portuguese territory.
- 10 June – A mass group of approximately 500 youths clash with police on a beach in Carcavelos after earlier robbing beachgoers, causing injuries to five people.
- 17 June – Prime Minister José Socrates announces that a planned referendum on the proposed constitution for the European Union will be postponed from its scheduled October date. The decision comes after European leaders confirm that the deadline for the constitution's ratification will be delayed until 2007 at the earliest.

=== July to September ===
- 30 July – The final edition of the Comércio do Porto newspaper is published following sustained losses by owner Prensa Ibérica, ending more than 150 years of continuous publication dating back to 1854.
- 20 August – A wildfire ignites near the city of Coimbra, destroying 4,179 hectares (16.14 sq mi) of forest and grassland. By 23 August the fire spreads to the outskirts of the city, forcing a small number of precautionary evacuations.

=== October to December ===
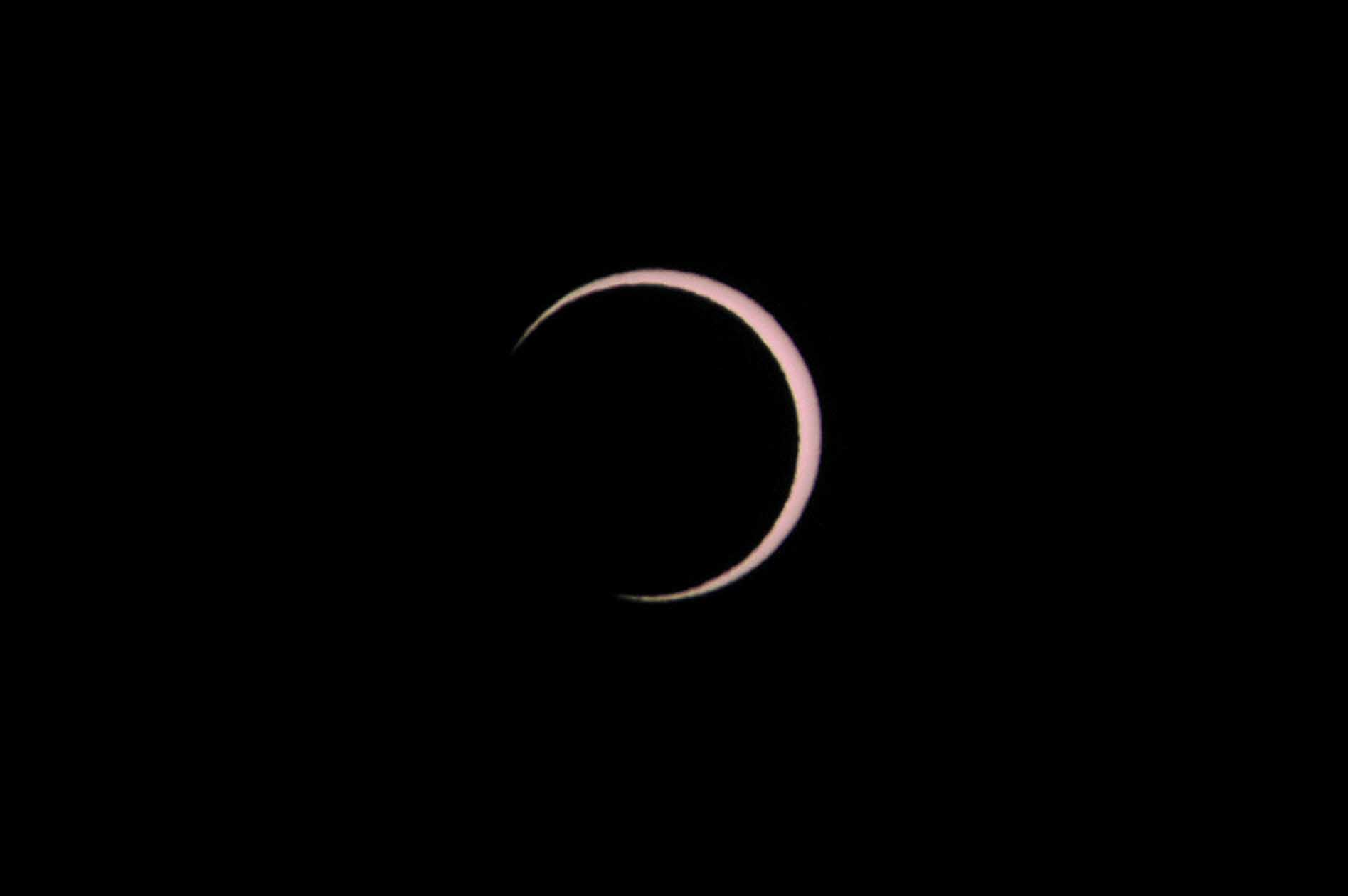
3 October: The solar eclipse as photographed from Pacos de Brandao

- 3 October – A solar eclipse visible over much of the country occurs, the first seen over Portuguese skies in the 21st century. The phenomena experienced varies across the country, with northern areas observing an annular eclipse and the rest of the nation as far south as Funchal witnessing a partial eclipse.
- 18 October – Police raid the homes of several key employees of the Banco Espírito Santo and the Banco Comercial Português as part of an investigation by state prosecutors into alleged tax evasion and money laundering. Estimates given by investigators suggest that the amount transferred by the suspects into tax havens to avoid VAT and income tax charges totals several million euros.
- 18 November – An explosion on an International Security Assistance Force (ISAF) patrol outside the Afghan capital of Kabul kills one Portuguese soldier and injures three more. The fatality is named as Sergeant Joao Pereira, who becomes the 25th ISAF soldier to be killed in Afghanistan in 2005.
- 23 December – Five people are killed and 43 are injured after a bus carrying Italian tourists crashes in Sao Vicente in northern Madeira.
- 24 December – Culture minister Isabel Pires de Lima confirms that a collection of more than 4,000 artworks owned by businessman José Berardo will be publicly exhibited at the Belem Cultural Centre in Lisbon. The agreement between the government and Berardo comes after seven years of attempted negotiations, in which Berardo threatened to house the collection outside of Portugal.

== Arts and entertainment ==
=== Music ===
- In music: Portugal in the Eurovision Song Contest 2005.

=== Film ===
- 27 January – The Fifth Empire released.

== Sports ==
Football (soccer) competitions: Primeira Liga, Liga de Honra

== Deaths ==
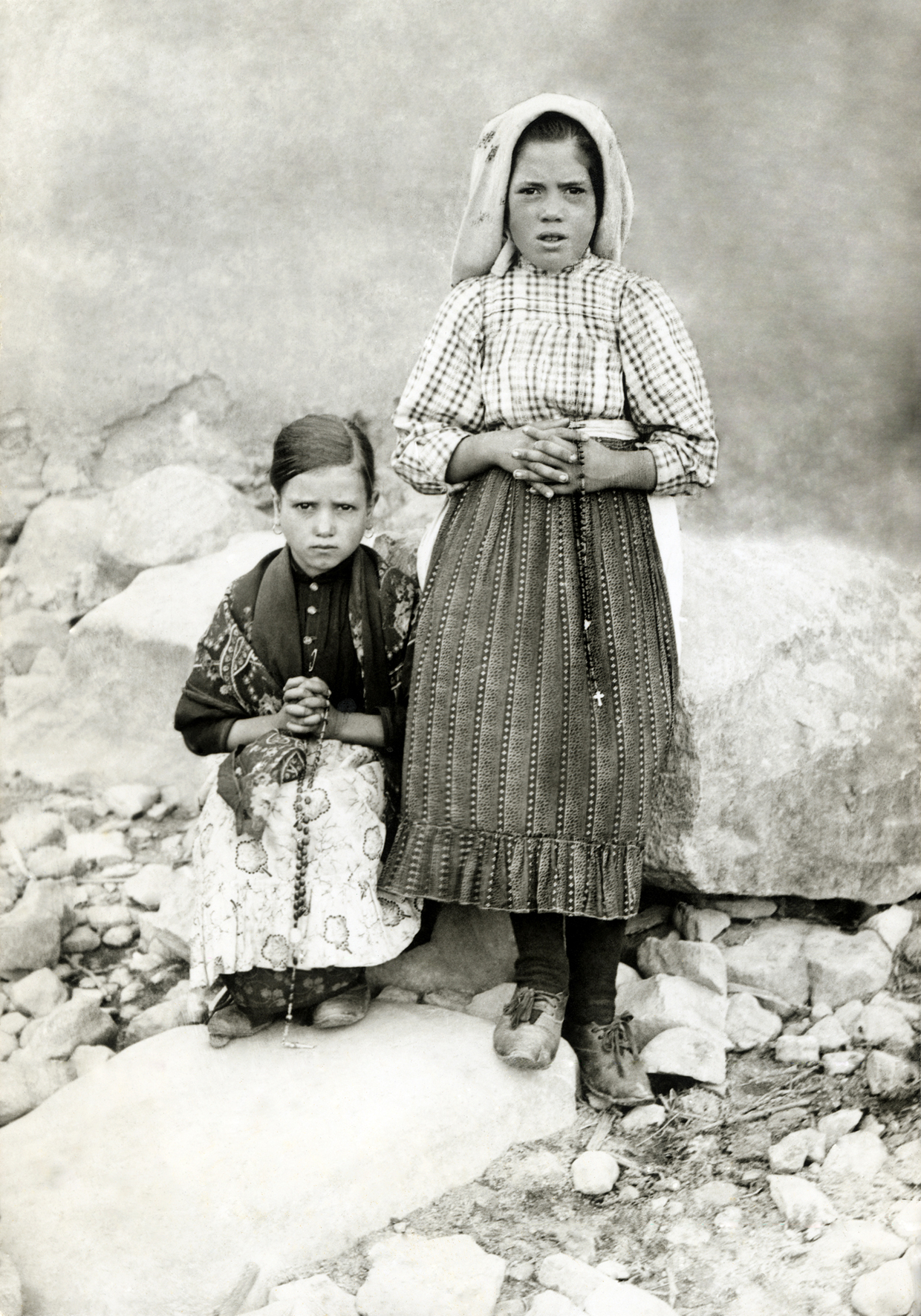
Lúcia dos Santos (standing)

- 13 February – Lúcia dos Santos, nun (born 1907).
- 11 June – Vasco Gonçalves, military officer and politician, Prime Minister of Portugal (1974–75) (born 1921).
- 13 June:
  - Eugénio de Andrade, poet (born 1923).
  - Alvaro Cunhal, politician (born 1913).
- 16 June – Corino Andrade, neurologist (born 1906).
- 25 July – Maria do Couto Maia-Lopes, supercentenarian (born 1890).
- 18 October – Carlos Gomes, footballer (born 1932).
- 23 November – Isabel de Castro, actress (born 1931).

== See also ==
- List of Portuguese films of 2005
