= List of Portuguese films of 2011 =

A list of Portuguese films that were first released in 2011. 30 Portuguese films were released, including 23 feature films, earning €415,953.44 at the Portuguese box office and accounting for 0.5% of the total box office gross, 0.7% of the total number of admissions and 8.1% of the total number of films in Portugal.

Release date	Title	Director	Cast	Genre	Notes	Ref
January 13	Complexo - Universo Paralelo	Mário Patrocínio		Documentary		
October 5	Blood of My Blood	João Canijo				
	48	Susana Sousa Dias		Documentary		
	A Cidade dos Mortos	Sérgio Tréfaut		Documentary		
	A Espada e a Rosa	João Nicolau				
	Águas Mil	Ivo M.Ferreira				
	América	João Nuno Pinto				
	A Morte de Carlos Gardel	Solveig Nordlund				
	Até Onde?	Carlos Magalhães de Barros				
	Budapeste	Walter Carvalho				
	Cisne	Teresa Villaverde				
	Com que Voz	Nicholas Oulman		Documentary		
	Durante o Fim	João Trabulo		Documentary		
	Efeitos Secundários	Paulo Rebelo				
	E o Tempo Passa	Alberto Seixas Santos		Drama		
	Espelho Lento	Solveig Nordlund			Short	
	Journey to Portugal	Sergio Tréfaut				
	The Eye of the Storm	Eduardo Valente				
	O Barão	Edgar Pêra				
	O Meu Raúl	Patricia Vasconcelos		Documentary	Short	
	Pão Nosso	Mónica Ferreira, João Luz		Documentary	Short	
	Perdida mente	Margarida Gil				
	Qinze Pontos na Alma	Vicente Alves do Ó				
	Quem Vai à Guerra	Marta Pessoa		Documentary		
	The North Canyon	Garrett McNamara, Paulo Caldeira, Polvo Concepts		Documentary		
	Sinfoia Imaterial	Tiago Pereira		Documentary	Short	
	This Side of Resurrection	Joaquim Sapinho				
	Universo de Mya	Miguel Clara Vasconcelos			Short	
	Voodoo	Sandro Aguilar			Short	
	Waiting for Paradise	Sérgio Tréfaut		Documentary	Short	

== See also ==
- 2011 in Portugal
