= 1928 in Portugal =

- Decades: 1900s; 1910s; 1920s; 1930s; 1940s
- See also: History of Portugal; Timeline of Portuguese history; List of years in Portugal

Events in the year 1928 in Portugal.

== Incumbents ==
- President: Óscar Carmona
- Prime Minister: Óscar Carmona (Independent) (until 18 April); José Vicente de Freitas (Independent) (from 18 April)

== Events ==
- March - Presidential election.
- 1 June - Driving on the right side introduced in Portugal (5 o'clock in the morning)
- Federação Escotista de Portugal founded

== Sports ==
- 30 June - 1928 Campeonato de Portugal Final
- 5 August – Portugal won a bronze medal in men's fencing, team épée, at the Summer Olympics
- C.F. Os Belenenses founded

== Deaths ==
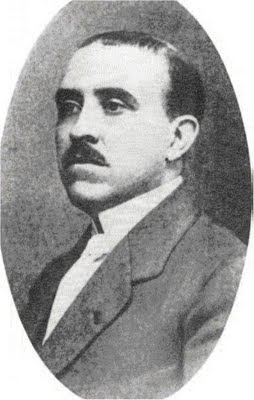
Álvaro de Castro

- 29 June – Álvaro de Castro, politician (born 1878)
