= Sob Evariste Dibo =

Ivorian former professional footballer

Personal information
- Full name: Sob Evariste Dibo
- Date of birth: 27 December 1968 (age 57)
- Place of birth: Abobo, Ivory Coast
- Height: 1.72 m (5 ft 8 in)
- Position: Attacking midfielder

Senior career*
Years	Team	Apps	(Gls)
1988–1989	Martigues	–	(–)
1989–1993	Grenoble	78	(6)
1993–1994	Ajaccio	12	(0)
1994–1995	Adana Demirspor	22	(2)
1995–1996	Vejle BK	5	(0)
1996–1998	Rio Ave	47	(8)
1999–2000	Braga	18	(1)
Total		182	(17)

International career
1993–1999	Ivory Coast	13	(0)
- * Club domestic league appearances and goals

Sob Evariste Dibo (born 27 December 1968) is an Ivorian former professional footballer who played as an attacking midfielder.

Dibo was part of the Ivory Coast national team who reached the quarter-finals of the 1998 African Cup of Nations.

== Legacy ==
Portuguese electronic band Sensible Soccers released a track named after Dibo on their 2014 album "8".
