= 2006 in Portugal =

- Decades: 1980s; 1990s; 2000s; 2010s; 2020s
- See also: History of Portugal; Timeline of Portuguese history; List of years in Portugal

Events in the year 2006 in Portugal.

== Incumbents ==
- President: Jorge Sampaio (until 9 March); Aníbal Cavaco Silva (from 9 March)
- Prime Minister: José Sócrates (Socialist)

== Events ==
- 10 January – Disestablishment of the National Solidarity Party
- 22 January – Portuguese presidential election, 2006
- 29 January – Snow recorded in Lisbon, Algarve and other southern and central regions of Portugal.

== Arts and entertainment ==
In music: Portugal in the Eurovision Song Contest 2006.

=== Film ===
- 9 March – Magic Mirror released.

== Sports ==
Football (soccer) competitions: Primeira Liga, Liga de Honra, Taça de Portugal.

== Deaths ==
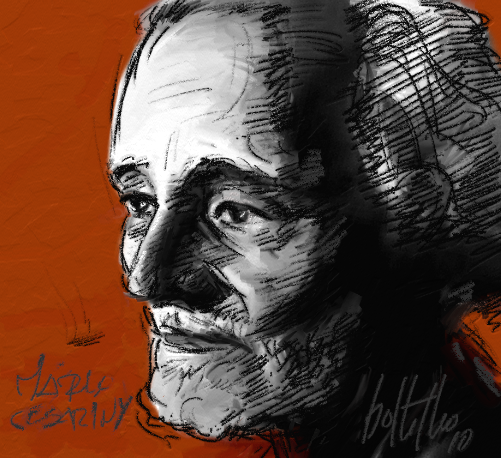
Mário Cesariny de Vasconcelos, painting by Bottelho

- 18 January – Leonardo Ribeiro de Almeida, politician (b. 1924).
- 16 April – Francisco Adam, actor (born 1983).
- 27 July – Carlos Roque, comics book artist (b. 1936).
- 26 November – Mário Cesariny de Vasconcelos, surrealist poet and painter (b. 1923).

== See also ==
- List of Portuguese films of 2006
