= 1930 in Portugal =

- Decades: 1910s; 1920s; 1930s; 1940s; 1950s
- See also: History of Portugal; Timeline of Portuguese history; List of years in Portugal

Events in the year 1930 in Portugal.

== Incumbents ==
- President: Óscar Carmona
- Prime Minister: Artur Ivens Ferraz (Independent) (until 21 January); Domingos Oliveira (National Union) (from 21 January)

== Events ==
- 21 January – Domingos Oliveira becomes Prime Minister
- The Technical University of Lisbon established

== Arts and entertainment ==
- Lisbon Book Fair first held

== Sports ==
- C.D. Aves founded
- GD Joane founded
- C.D. Trofense founded

== Births ==
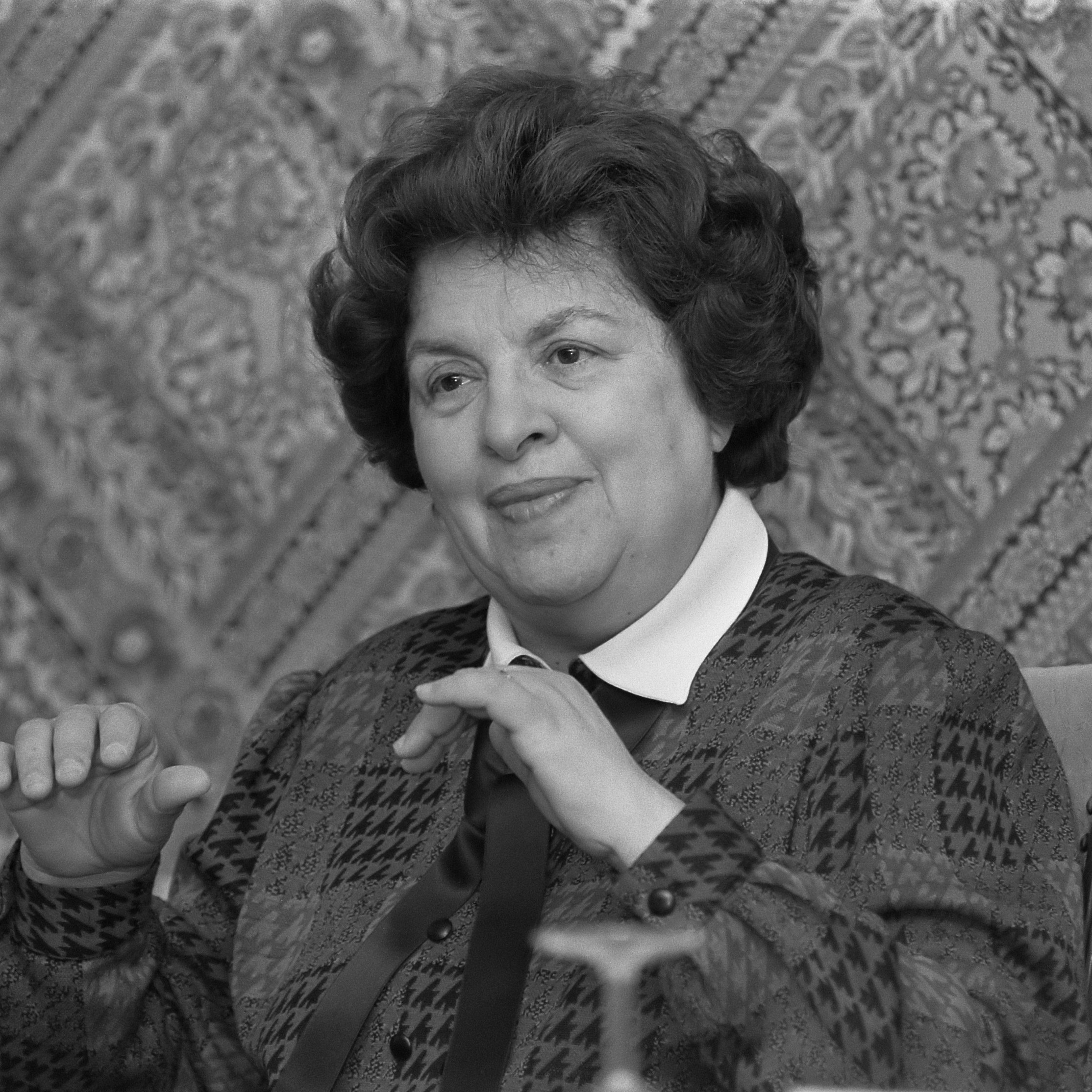
Maria de Lourdes Pintasilgo

- 1 January – Mário Quina, sailor. (died in 2017)
- 18 January – Maria de Lourdes Pintasilgo, chemical engineer and politician (died in 2004)

== Deaths ==
- December 8 – Florbela Espanca, Portuguese poet (b. 1894)
