= 1933 in Portugal =

- Decades: 1910s; 1920s; 1930s; 1940s; 1950s
- See also: History of Portugal; Timeline of Portuguese history; List of years in Portugal

Events in the year 1933 in Portugal.

== Incumbents ==
- President: Óscar Carmona
- Prime Minister: António de Oliveira Salazar (National Union)

== Events ==
- A constitutional referendum establishes the Estado Novo

== Arts and entertainment ==
- José Malhoa Museum established

== Sports ==
- C.D. Tondela founded
- S.C. Freamunde founded
- Futebol Benfica founded
- S.C. Mineiro Aljustrelense founded

== Births ==
- 2 May – Celeste Caeiro, pacifist and political activist (died 2024)
- 25 June – Álvaro Siza, architect

== Deaths ==
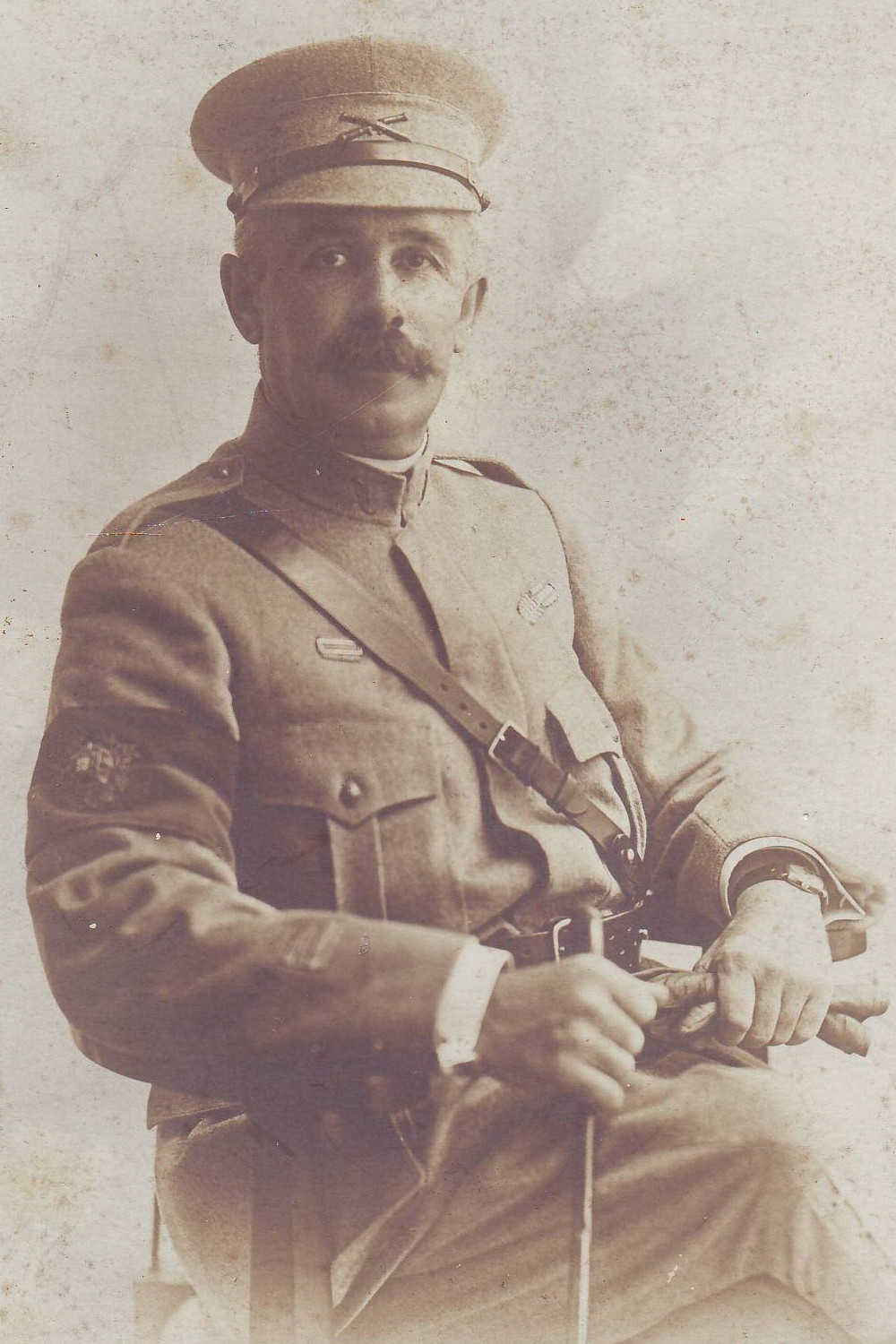
Artur Ivens Ferraz

- 16 January – Artur Ivens Ferraz, military officer and politician (born 1870)
