= 2011 in Portugal =

- Decades: 1990s; 2000s; 2010s; 2020s; 2030s
- See also: History of Portugal; Timeline of Portuguese history; List of years in Portugal

Events in the year 2011 in Portugal.

== Incumbents ==
- President: Aníbal Cavaco Silva
- Prime Minister: José Sócrates (Socialist) (until 21 June); Pedro Passos Coelho (Social Democratic) (from 21 June)

== Events ==
- January 1 - Portugal becomes a non-permanent member of the United Nations Security Council
- January 23 - Portuguese presidential election, 2011
- 12 March - the anti-austerity movement in Portugal begins with over 300,000 people marching in Lisbon and Porto.

== Arts and entertainment ==
Music: Portugal in the Eurovision Song Contest 2011.

== Sports ==
Football (soccer) competitions: Primeira Liga, Liga de Honra, Taça da Liga, Taça de Portugal.

In rink hockey: CIRH U-20 World Cup.

== See also ==
- List of Portuguese films of 2011
