= The Artist and the City =

- Film poster of the documentary
- Directed by: Manoel de Oliveira
- Written by: Manoel de Oliveira
- Produced by: Manoel de Oliveira
- Starring: António Cruz
- Cinematography: Manoel de Oliveira
- Edited by: Manoel de Oliveira
- Music by: Luís Rodrigues
- Release date: 1956
- Running time: 26 min
- Country: Portugal

The Artist and the City (Portuguese: O Pintor e a Cidade) is a 1956 short Portuguese documentary film directed by Manoel de Oliveira. The film shows a series of watercolor paintings by Portuguese artist António Cruz of what he sees while walking through different parts of the city of Porto. It was the first color film directed by Oliveira. Oliveira considers it forms a trilogy about the Douro and Porto, with Douro, Faina Fluvial and Aniki-Bóbó

== Legacy ==
In 2021, Porto-based electronic band Sensible Soccers "fulfilled their long-held wish" to create an original soundtrack for de Oliveira's 1931 silent film "Douro, Faina Fluvial", which coincided with the 90th anniversary of its release that year. Along with his 1956 film The Artist and the City, the band initiated a project in which they created music to accompany the two films in tandem, which resulted in the LP Manoel. In September 2021, the band premiered the music live alongside a screening of the two films at the Casa do Cinema at the Serralves Museum in Porto.
