= 2010–2014 Portuguese financial crisis =

Economic recession in Portugal

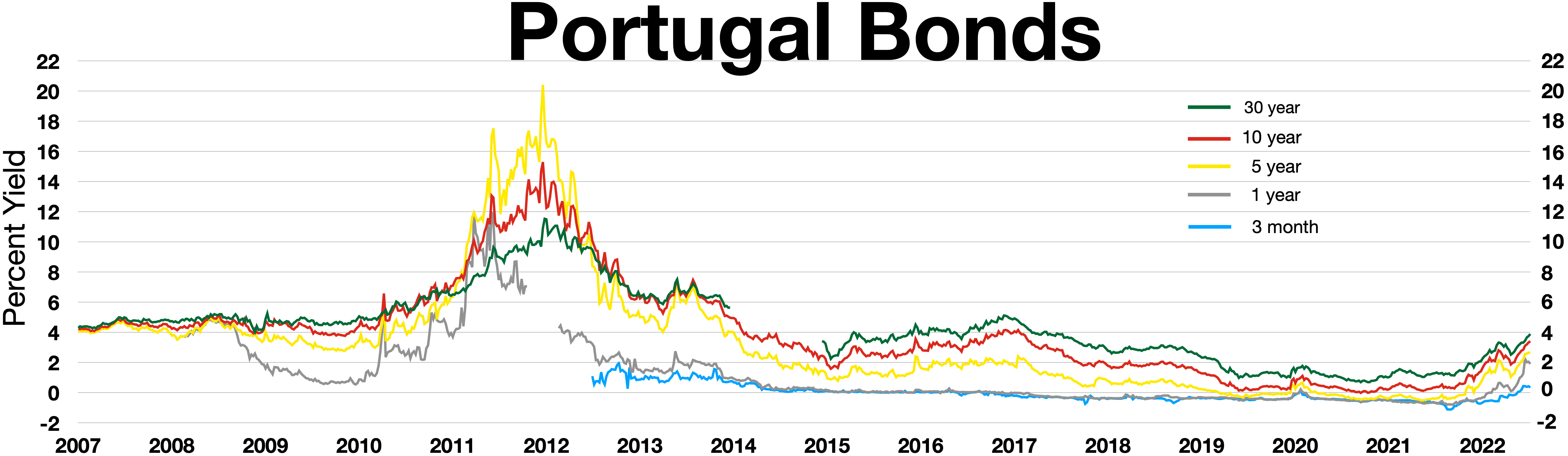
Portugal bonds 30 year bond 10 year bond 5 year bond 1 year bond 3 month bond

The 2010–2014 Portuguese financial crisis was part of the wider downturn of the Portuguese economy that started in 2001 and possibly ended between 2016 and 2017. The period from 2010 to 2014 was probably the hardest and more challenging part of the entire economic crisis; this period includes the 2011–14 international bailout to Portugal and was marked by intense austerity policies, more intense than the wider 2001-2017 crisis. Economic growth stalled in Portugal between 2001 and 2002, and following years of internal economic crisis, the worldwide Great Recession started to hit Portugal in 2008 and eventually led to the country being unable to repay or refinance its government debt without the assistance of third parties. To prevent an insolvency situation in the debt crisis, Portugal applied in April 2011 for bail-out programs and drew a cumulated €78 billion from the IMF, the EFSM, and the EFSF. Portugal exited the bailout in May 2014, the same year that positive economic growth re-appeared following three years of recession. The government achieved a 2.1% budget deficit in 2016 (the lowest since the restoration of democracy in 1974) and in 2017 the economy grew 2.7% (the highest growth rate since 2000).

== Causes ==
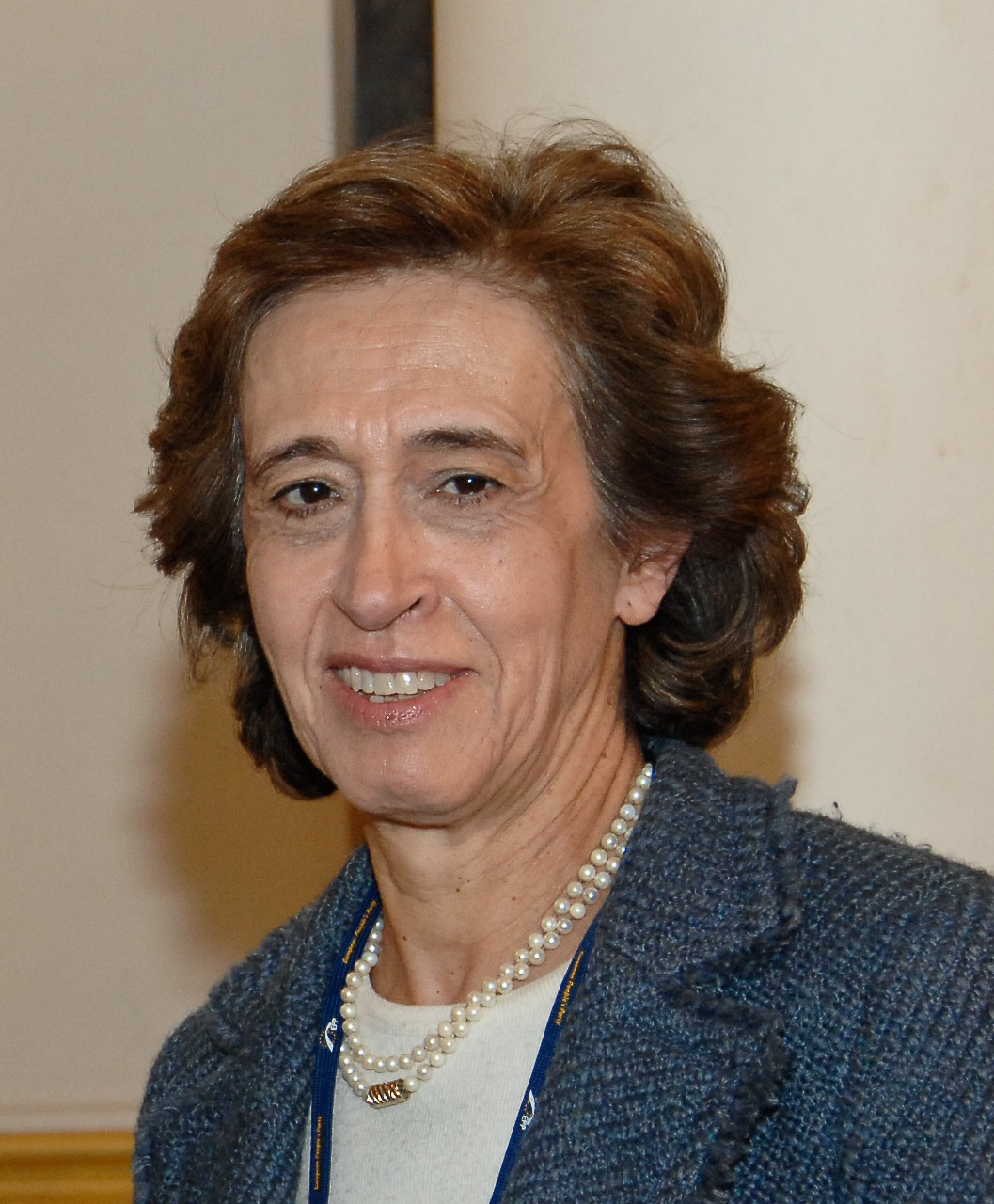
Manuela Ferreira Leite was the Minister of Finance from 2002 to 2004, in the cabinet of José Manuel Durão Barroso.

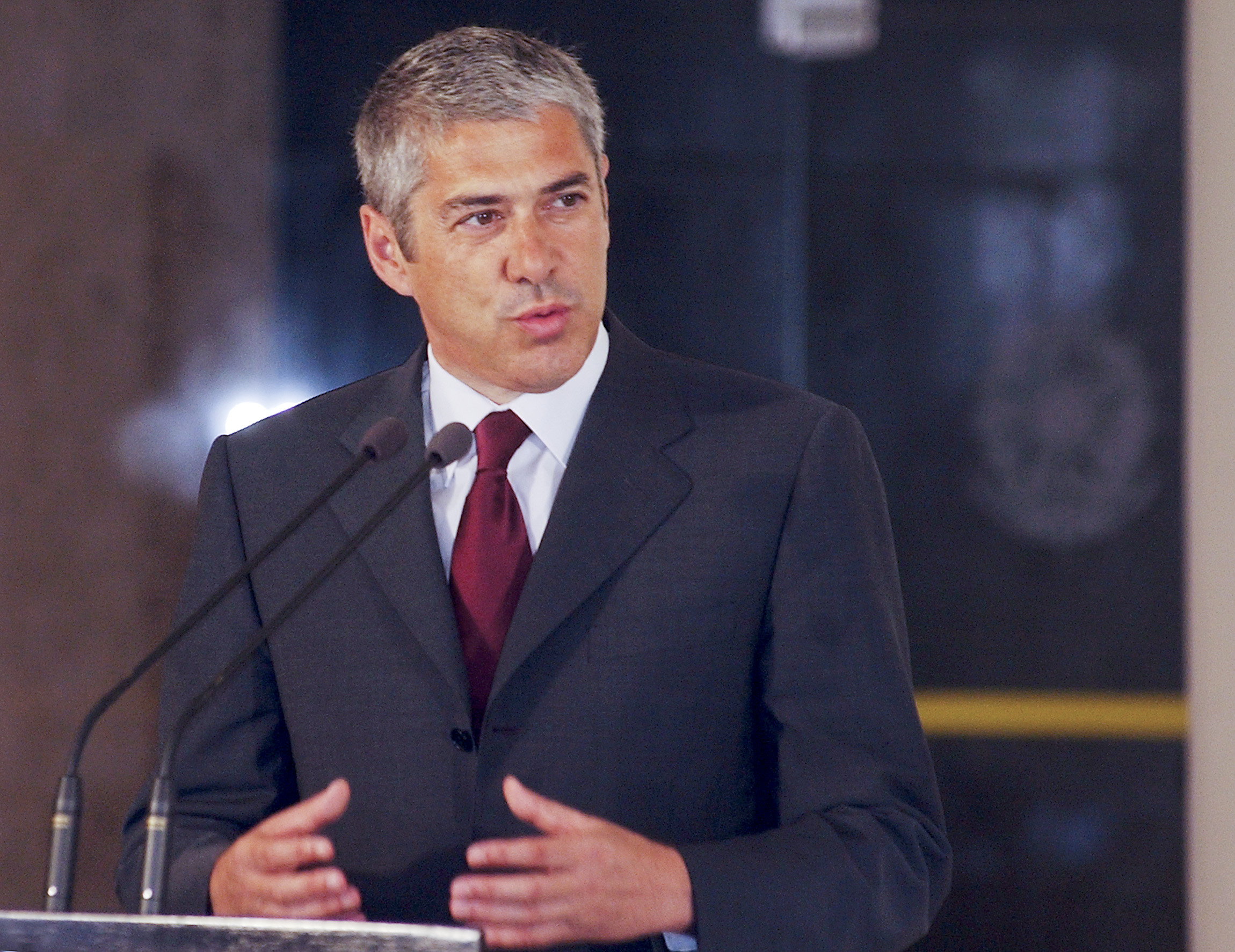
From 2005 to 2011, José Sócrates of the Socialist Party (PS) was the prime minister and the leader of the Portuguese Government.

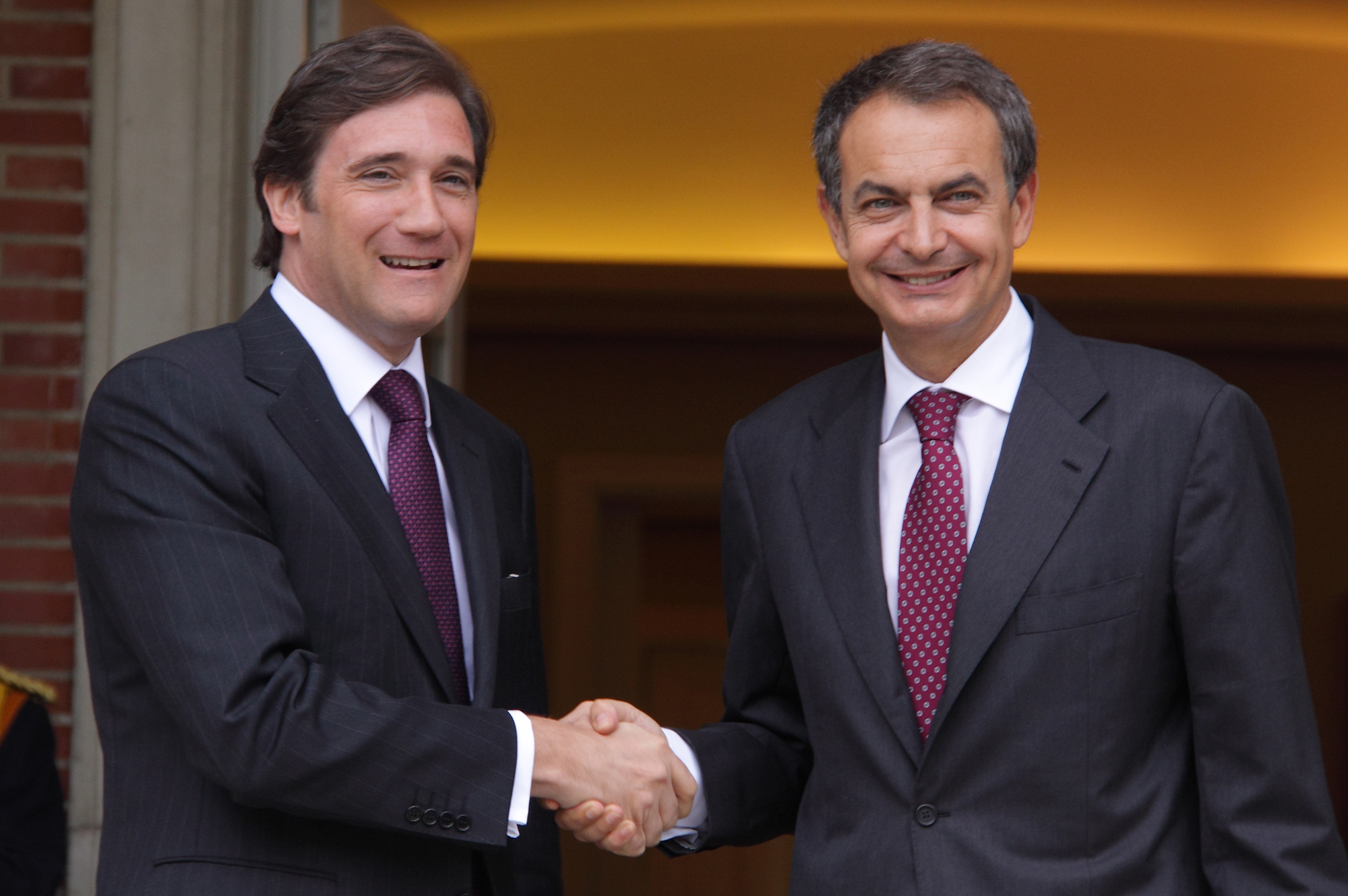
Prime Ministers Pedro Passos Coelho (left) from Portugal (in office since 21 June 2011 after José Sócrates has called for a Portuguese bail-out in April 2011), and Rodriguez Zapatero, from Spain, in October 2011. With economic downturn and a rising unemployment rate (over 10% unemployment rate in Portugal and 20% in Spain by 2011), the two countries of the Iberian Peninsula were trapped right in the middle of the European sovereign debt crisis.

=== 2000s economic crisis ===
Unlike other European countries that were also severely hit by the Great Recession in the late 2000s and received bailouts in the early 2010s (such as Greece and Ireland), in Portugal the 2000s were not marked by economic growth, but instead were already a period of economic crisis, marked by stagnation, two recessions (in 2002–03 and 2008–09) and government-sponsored fiscal austerity in order to reduce the budget deficit to the limits allowed by the European Union's Stability and Growth Pact.

From the early 1960s to the early 2000s, Portugal endured three periods of robust economic growth and socio-economic development (approximately from 1960 to 1973, from 1985 to 1992 and from 1995 to 2001) which made the country's GDP per capita to rise from 39% of the Northern-Central European average in 1960 to 70% in 2000. Although, by 2000, Portugal was still the poorest country in Western Europe, it nevertheless had achieved a level of convergence with the developed economies in Central and Northern Europe which had no precedents in the previous centuries, a catching-up process which was expected to continue. Portugal still entered well in the 2000s, registering an almost 4% GDP growth rate in 2000, but growth slowed along 2001; that year's growth rate was 2.0% and the unexpected slowdown was one of the causes that made the government's (still led by socialist António Guterres) budget deficit to slip to 4.1%; Portugal thus became the first Eurozone country to clearly break the SGP's 3% limit for the budget deficit, and thus, it was opened an excessive deficit procedure. The 2002 snap election brought to power the Social Democrats led by José Manuel Durão Barroso; his government was marked by the introduction of harsh fiscal austerity policies and structural reforms, mainly justified by the need to reduce the budget deficit, a set of policies designed by his Finance Minister Manuela Ferreira Leite. Portuguese economy grew a combined 0.8% in 2002, was in recession in 2003 (-0.9%) and grew 1.6% in 2004. Ferreira Leite managed to keep deficit on 2.9% both in 2003 and in 2004, but through one-off and extraordinary measures. Otherwise, the deficit would have hit the 5% mark. Meanwhile, the first half of the 2000s also saw the end of the downward trend in the government debt to GDP ratio that marked the 1990s: the ratio rose from 53% in 2000 to 62% in 2004 (the ratio overtook the SGP's arbitrary limit of 60% in 2003).

Socialist José Sócrates became Prime Minister in 2005; like his conservative predecessor, Sócrates tried to reduce the government's budget deficit through austerity and tax hikes. By then, the Portuguese economy was clearly lagging behind European partners and the 2005 budget deficit was expected to be above 6% if no extraordinary measures were used. In the Stability and Growth Programme for 2005–2009, the Sócrates' government proposed to let the budget deficit to be higher than 6% in 2005, but to structurally reduce it to below 3% until 2008, a plan which was accepted by the European authorities. A notable milepost in the crisis happened in 2005, when the Portuguese unemployment rate overtook the European average for the first time since 1986. In 2007, the government achieved a 2.6% budget deficit (one year before target), below the 3.0% limit allowed by the Stability and Growth Pact. That year, the economy grew 2.4%, the highest rate in the decade (excluding 2000). Nevertheless, also in 2007, the comparatively low growth rate made The Economist to describe Portugal as "a new sick man of Europe". From 2005 to 2007, public debt was stable at a ratio of approximately 68% of the GDP.

The Great Recession started to hit Portugal in 2008; that year the Portuguese economy did not grow (0.0%) and fell almost 3% in 2009. Meanwhile, the government reported a 2.6% budget deficit in 2008 which rose to almost 10% in 2009. Austerity was somewhat waned in 2008–2010, as part of the European economy recovery plan and the resurgence of Keynesianism (which called for anti-cyclic policies), but was resumed in May 2010. In 2010 there was economic growth (1.9%) but the financial status remained very difficult (8.6% budget deficit); the country eventually became unable to repay or refinance its government debt and requested a bailout in April 2011; in 2011 the economy fell 1.3% and the government reported a 4.2% budget deficit. Meanwhile, government debt-to-GDP ratio sharply rose from 68% in 2007 to 111% in 2011.

In the end, Portuguese economy grew less on a per capita basis in the 2000s and early 2010s than the American economy during the Great Depression or the Japanese economy during the Lost Decade. Despite government policies openly aimed to consolidate the Portuguese public finances, (Note: An "everyday" example of the tax hikes during the 2000s crisis is the VAT's standard rate, which rose from 17% in 2002 to 23% in 2011.) Portugal was almost always under excessive deficit procedure (Note: In the 2000s and early 2010s, Portugal was under excessive deficit procedure (EDP) in 2002–2004, 2005–2008 and from 2009 on (this last EDP was closed in 2017).) and government debt-to-GDP ratio rose from 50% in 2000 to 68% in 2007 and 126% in 2012. The causes of the stagnation are complex, as many potential causes also affect other Southern European countries and did not prevent them from growing in the 2000s, nor did prevent Portugal from growing before the early 2000s. Economist Ferreira do Amaral points to the accession to Euro in 1999–2002, which was too strong as a currency for Portugal's economy and industry and took away from the country the ability to direct its own monetary (rise or reduce interest rates) and cambial policy (currency devaluation). Vítor Bento also thinks that the belonging to a currency union created numerous challenges to which the Portuguese economy was not able to adapt. Bento also points out that Euro was the root cause for many of the internal macroeconomic disequilibria inside Eurozone – such as excessive external deficits in periphery countries (such as Portugal) and excessive external surplus in core countries – and that such disequilibria were the main cause of the Euro area crisis (and were, to a great extent, more to important to explain the crisis than states' public finances). A set of economists (including former Prime Minister and eventual President Aníbal Cavaco Silva, an economically liberal scholar and politician) points to the excessive size of the Portuguese government, whose total expenditures overtook 45% of the GDP in 2005. Such hypothesis was eventually the basis for the austerity requested as conditionality for the 2011–2014 European Union/IMF bailout. For Ricardo Reis, the accession to Euro was a root cause for the 2000s crisis, but for different reasons than the ones put forward by Ferreira do Amaral: the low interest rates allowed an influx of foreign capital, which the country's weak financial system misallocated to the low-productive non-tradable sector, reducing the economy's overall productivity. Meanwhile, the Social Security system was demanding increasing public spending, and the constant tax hikes in the 2000s limited the potential for growth of the Portuguese economy. It is noteworthy that from 2000 to 2007, taxes as share of GDP increased 1.7% in Portugal but declined 0.9% in Eurozone. Another factor at the root of the stagnation may be that Portuguese economy faced increasing competition by Eastern European countries and China, which were economies also specialized in low wages and low-value-added goods. Other more structural problems identified were excessive corruption, and regulation, which makes difficult for business to get bigger and achieve economies-of-scale, as also the low educational attainment of Portuguese adults, low total factor productivity, rigid labour market laws and an inefficient and slow judicial system.

=== Anxiety on financial markets ===
After the 2008 financial crisis, it was known in 2008–2009 that two Portuguese banks (Banco Português de Negócios (BPN) and Banco Privado Português (BPP)) had been accumulating losses for years due to bad investments, embezzlement and accounting fraud. The case of BPN was particularly serious because of its size, market share, and the political implications - Portugal's then current President, Aníbal Cavaco Silva, and some of his political allies, maintained personal and business relationships with the bank and its CEO, who was eventually charged and arrested for fraud and other crimes. In the grounds of avoiding a potentially serious financial crisis in the Portuguese economy, the Portuguese government decided to give them a bailout, eventually at a future loss to taxpayers.

In the opening weeks of 2010, renewed anxiety about the excessive levels of debt in some EU countries and, more generally, about the health of the Euro spread from Ireland and Greece to Portugal, Spain, and Italy. In 2010, PIIGS and PIGS acronyms were widely used by international bond analysts, academics, and the international economic press when referring to these under performing economies.

Some senior German policy makers went as far as to say that emergency bailouts to Greece and future EU aid recipients should bring with it harsh penalties.

Robert Fishman, in the New York Times article "Portugal's Unnecessary Bailout", points out that Portugal fell victim to successive waves of speculation by pressure from bond traders, rating agencies and speculators. In the first quarter of 2010, before pressure from the markets, Portugal had one of the best rates of economic recovery in the EU. From the perspective of Portugal's industrial orders, exports, entrepreneurial innovation and high-school achievement, the country matched or even surpassed its neighbors in Western Europe. However, the Portuguese economy had been creating its own problems over a lengthy period of time, which came to a head with the financial crisis. Persistent and lasting recruitment policies boosted the number of redundant public servants. Risky credit, public debt creation, and European structural and cohesion funds were mismanaged across almost four decades. Portugal would be persistently criticized for years to come by institutions and organizations like the OECD, the IMF and the European Union for its anti-market, labor movement-inspired labor laws and rules which promoted overstaffing and the misallocation of factors of production in general.

In the summer of 2010, Moody's Investors Service cut Portugal's sovereign bond rating down two notches from an Aa2 to an A1 Due to spending on economic stimuli, Portugal's debt had increased sharply compared to the gross domestic product. Moody noted that the rising debt would weigh heavily on the government's short-term finances.

=== Austerity measures amid increased pressure on government bonds ===
In September 2010, the XVIII Constitutional Government of Portugal announced a fresh austerity package following other Eurozone partners, through a series of tax hikes and salary cuts for public servants. In 2009, the deficit had been 9.4 percent, one of the highest in the Eurozone and well above the European Union's Stability and Growth Pact three percent limit. In November risk premiums on Portuguese bonds hit euro lifetime highs as investors and creditors worried that the country would fail to rein in its budget deficit and debt. The yield on the country's 10-year government bonds reached 7 percent – a level the Portuguese Finance Minister Fernando Teixeira dos Santos had previously said would require the country to seek financial help from international institutions. Also in 2010, the country reached a record high unemployment rate of nearly 11%, a figure not seen for over two decades, while the number of public servants remained very high.

On 23 March 2011, José Sócrates resigned following passage of a no confidence motion sponsored by all five opposition parties in parliament over spending cuts and tax increases. On 6 April 2011, José Sócrates, still in charge of the country, announced the requesting of an international financial rescue package to the Portuguese Republic. In May 2011, the European Union and the International Monetary Fund sealed a three-year €78 billion financial rescue plan for Portugal in a bid to stabilise its public finances. After the bailout was announced, the newly-elected Portuguese government headed by Pedro Passos Coelho managed to implement measures to improve the State's financial situation and the country started to be seen as moving on the right track. Despite the unemployment rate having reached new highs above 15 per cent in the second quarter 2012, the country would be able to overcome the crisis and emerge stronger because the economic adjustment was producing the desirable effects on the Portuguese economy and public debt situation. Elections were held on 4 October 2015, with the Portugal à Frente (PaF) coalition between PSD and CDS-PP parties led by PSD's Pedro Passos Coelho, being the most voted political force with 38.5% of the votes – but it lost the absolute majority that the two parties had in parliament, leaving it with 107 deputies (89 from PSD and 18 from CDS-PP), out of a total of 230. Without that majority, socialist and communist parties banded together to form a coalition in the parliament and after avail of the President Aníbal Cavaco Silva and according to the law, the XXI Constitutional Government, headed by António Costa of the Socialist Party, took office on 26 November 2015, 53 days after the legislative elections won by PaF.

== Economic Adjustment Programme for Portugal ==
On 6 April 2011, the resigning Prime Minister José Sócrates of the Socialist Party (PS) announced on television that the country, facing a status of bankruptcy, would request financial assistance to the IMF and the European Financial Stability Facility, like Greece and Ireland had done before. On 16 May 2011, the eurozone leaders officially approved a €78 billion bailout package for Portugal.

== Re-access to financial markets ==
A positive turning point in Portugal's strive to regain access to financial markets, was achieved on 3 October 2012, when the state managed to convert €3.76 billion of bonds with maturity in September 2013 (carrying a 3.10% yield) to new bonds with maturity in October 2015 (carrying a 5.12% yield). Before the bond exchange, the state had a total of €9.6 billion outstanding notes due in 2013, which according to the bailout plan should be renewed by the sale of new bonds on the market. As Portugal was already able to renew one-third of the outstanding bonds at a reasonable yield level, the market now expect the upcoming renewals in 2013 also to be conducted at reasonable yield levels. The bailout funding programme will run until June 2014, but at the same time require Portugal to regain a complete bond market access in September 2013. The recent sale of bonds with a 3-year maturity, was the first bond sale of the Portuguese state since requesting the bailout in April 2011, and the first step slowly to open up its governmental bond market again. Recently the ECB announced they will be ready also, to begin additional support to Portugal, with some yield-lowering bond purchases (OMTs), when the country regained complete market access. All together this bodes well for a further decline of the governmental interest rates in Portugal, which on 30 January 2012 had a peak for the 10-year rate at 17.3% (after the rating agencies had cut the governments credit rating to "non-investment grade" -also referred to as "junk"), and as of 24 November 2012 has been more than halved to only 7.9%.

== Rejection of austerity conditions and political crisis ==
In the parliamentary elections of October 2015, the ruling right wing party failed to achieve an operating majority despite having won the elections by a solid margin. An anti-austerity post-electoral left wing coalition was formed achieving 51% of the vote and 53% of elected MPs, however, the President of Portugal at first refused to allow the left wing coalition to govern, inviting the minority right wing coalition to form a government. This was formed in November 2015 and lasted 11 days when it lost motion of confidence. The President eventually invited and asked the Socialist Party to form a government supported by 123 of 230 MPs in parliament from all parties except the former right wing coalition which broke into two parties. The new government (of the Socialist Party and independents) took office in November 2015 with a parliamentary majority thanks to the support of the Left Bloc, the Green Party and the Communist Party and the abstention of the Animal Welfare Party (PAN). In 2017, the IMF saw a 2.5 percent growth rate and an unemployment rate below 10 percent, but the European Commission expected Portugal's Government debt to reach 128.5 percent of GDP.

== Key economic data in 2016 ==
- Budget deficit in 2016 was 2.1% of GDP, 0.4% the arbitrary limit set for it by the EC, the lowest since 1974, and less than half of the previous government's last year in power 2015. It is also 0.9% below the limits agreed at Maastricht.
- In 2016, Portuguese GDP was $259 billion, up by about 3% from 2015, and 21% from its record low in 2012.
- In 2016, Portugal registered a 14-year sequence of continuous increases in debt-to-GDP ratios, i.e., since the adoption of the Euro as currency.
- In 2016, combined sovereign and personal debt in Portugal was the 5th largest in the Eurozone, reaching a combined 390% of GDP
- In April 2017, the unemployment rate was 9.5%, over 8% below the all-time high reached in 2013 though still slightly above the 43-year average since the country became a democracy.

== See also ==
- European sovereign debt crisis
- Economy of Portugal
- Economic history of Portugal
- 2010 Portuguese general strike
