= List of Portuguese films of 2008 =

A list of Portuguese films that were first released in 2008.

Release date	Title	Director	Cast	Genre	Notes	Ref
January 10	Christopher Columbus - The Enigma	Manoel de Oliveira	Ricardo Trêpa, Leonor Baldaque		5.577 admissions	
January 24	From Now On	Catarina Ruivo	Edgar Morais, Adelaide de Sousa		1.942 admissions	
March 13	Wolves	José Nascimento	Nuno Melo, Catarina Wallenstein		2.034 admissions	
March 13	The Lovebirds	Bruno de Almeida	Joaquim de Almeida, Rogério Samora		2.515 admissions	
May 8	A Ilha dos Escravos	Francisco Manso	Vanessa Giácomo, Diogo Infante		2.305 admissions	
May 8	Cartas a Uma Ditadura	Inês de Medeiros			2.039 admissions	
May 15	Goodnight Irene	Paolo Marinou-Blanco			2.959 admissions	
August 21	Our Beloved Month of August	Miguel Gomes			20.073 admissions	
October 9	Misbegotten	João Canijo			1.661 admissions	
October 23	Noise	Tiago Guedes, Frederico Serra			3.430 admissions	
November 6	The Art of Stealing	Leonel Vieira			28.942 admissions	
December 4	Amália	Carlos Coelho da Silva			136.798 admissions	

== See also ==
- 2008 in Portugal
