= Douro, Faina Fluvial =

1931 film

- Directed by: Manoel de Oliveira
- Produced by: Manoel de Oliveira
- Release date: 19 September 1931
- Running time: 21 minutes
- Country: Portugal
- Language: Silent

Douro, Faina Fluvial (Labor on the Douro River) is a 1931 Portuguese documentary short film. It was the first film directed by Manoel de Oliveira and is a portrait of his hometown of Porto and the labor and industry that takes place along the city's main river, the Douro River.

== Reception ==
Douro, Faina Fluvial was first shown at the International Congress of Film Critics in Lisbon on 19 September 1931, where the majority of the Portuguese audience booed. However, other foreign critics and artists who were in attendance praised the film, such as Luigi Pirandello and Émile Vuillermoz. Oliveira re-edited the film with a new soundtrack and re-released it in 1934. Again in 1994, Oliveira modified the film by adding a new, more avant-garde soundtrack by Luís de Freitas Branco.

Oliveira was influenced by German filmmaker Walther Ruttmann's documentary Berlin: Symphony of a City, and Douro, Faina Fluvial was made in the same genre of city symphony films.

== Legacy ==
In 2021, Porto-based electronic band Sensible Soccers "fulfilled their long-held wish" to create an original soundtrack for the film, which coincided with the 90th anniversary of its release that year. Along with de Oliveira's 1956 film The Artist and the City, the band initiated a project in which they created music to accompany the two films in tandem, which resulted in the LP Manoel. In September 2021, the band premiered the music live alongside a screening of the two films at the Casa do Cinema at the Serralves Museum in Porto.
