= Pires (Portuguese footballer) =

Portuguese footballer

Francisco Pires
Personal information
- Full name: Francisco Torrão Pires
- Date of birth: 8 March 1931 (age 95)
- Place of birth: Portugal
- Position: Defender

Senior career*
Years	Team	Apps	(Gls)
- Belenenses

International career
1957	Portugal	1	(0)
- * Club domestic league appearances and goals

Francisco Torrão Pires (born 8 March 1931) known as Francisco Pires, is a former Portuguese footballer who played as a defender.
