= 2003 in Portugal =

- Decades: 1980s; 1990s; 2000s; 2010s; 2020s
- See also: History of Portugal; Timeline of Portuguese history; List of years in Portugal

Events in the year 2003 in Portugal.

== Incumbents ==
- President: Jorge Sampaio
- Prime Minister: José Manuel Barroso (Social Democratic)

== Arts and entertainment ==
- International Sand Sculpture Festival established; held annually in Pêra, Algarve

== Sports ==
- 20 January to 2 February – The 2003 World Men's Handball Championship took place in Portugal
- Football (soccer) competitions: Primeira Liga, Liga de Honra

== Deaths ==
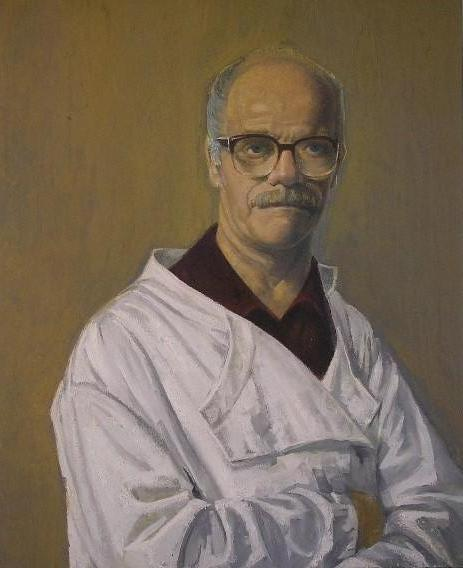
Manuel Pereira da Silva

- 10 July – Manuel Vasques, football player (born 1926).
- 30 November – António Jesus Correia, football player (born 1924)

=== Full date missing ===
- Manuel Pereira da Silva, sculptor (born 1920)

== See also ==
- List of Portuguese films of 2003
