= Edite Soeiro =

Portuguese journalist

- Born: Edite Castro Soeiro; March 31, 1934; Province of Angola
- Died: July 27, 2009 (aged 75)
- Occupation: Journalist

Edite Castro Soeiro (March 31, 1934 – July 27, 2009) was a Portuguese journalist, notable as one of the first women to attain a senior position in Portuguese journalism. She was born in Angola, where she worked for the Benguela weekly O Intransigente in the 1950s before moving to Portugal and working for the publications Flama, Notícia, O Jornal, and Visão, among others.

In 2006, Soeiro received a Merit Award from the Portuguese Journalists' Association.
