= List of Portuguese films of 2005 =

A list of Portuguese films that were first released in 2005.

Release date	Title	Director	Cast	Genre	Notes	Ref
January 27	The Fifth Empire	Manoel de Oliveira			8,218 admissions	
March 17	A Shot in the Dark	Leonel Vieira			28,571 admissions	
March 24	A Cara que Mereces	Miguel Gomes			773 admissions	
April 14	Antes que o Tempo Mude	Luís Fonseca				
May 26	Adriana	Margarida Gil			7,019 admissions	
September 15	Um Rio	José Carlos de Oliveira			1,555 admissions	
October 6	Alice	Marco Martins			33,489 admissions	
October 27	O Crime do Padre Amaro	Carlos Coelho da Silva			317,234 admissions	
December 8	The Fatalist	João Botelho			3,291 admissions	
December 29	Two Drifters	João Pedro Rodrigues			1,846 admissions	

== See also ==
- 2005 in Portugal
