= Raúl Figueiredo =

Portuguese footballer (born 1927)

Raul Figueiredo
Personal information
- Full name: Raul António Leandro de Figueiredo
- Date of birth: 10 March 1927 (age 99)
- Place of birth: Portugal
- Position: Defender

Senior career*
Years	Team	Apps	(Gls)
- Belenenses

International career
	Portugal	3	(0)
- * Club domestic league appearances and goals

Raul António Leandro de Figueiredo (born 10 March 1927) Portuguese former footballer who played as a defender.
