= António dos Reis Rodrigues =

- Titular bishop of Madarsuma
- Church: Roman Catholic Church
- See: Titular see
- In office: 1968–1998
- Predecessor: none
- Successor: current
- Previous post(s): Auxiliary Bishop

Orders
- Ordination: 1 March 1947

Personal details
- Born: 24 June 1918; Vila Nova de Ourém, Portugal
- Died: 3 February 2009 (aged 90); Lisbon, Portugal

António dos Reis Rodrigues (24 June 1918 – 3 February 2009) was a Portuguese Bishop of the Roman Catholic Church.

== Biography ==
Rodrigues was born in Vila Nova de Ourém, Portugal and was ordained a priest on 1 March 1947. Rodrigues was appointed Auxiliary bishop of the Archdiocese of Lisbon, along with titular bishop of Madarsuma, on 25 October 1966 and ordained bishop on 8 January 1967. Rodrigues retired from the Archdiocese of Lisbon on 5 September 1998.
