= Mário Torres =

Portuguese footballer (1931–2020)

Personal information
- Date of birth: 13 September 1931
- Place of birth: Huambo, Angola
- Date of death: 4 June 2020 (aged 88)
- Place of death: Coimbra, Portugal
- Position: Midfielder

Senior career*
| Years | Team | Apps | (Gls) |
| 1950–1966 | Académica | 366 | (32) |

International career
| 1957–1959 | Portugal | 5 | (0) |
- * Club domestic league appearances and goals

Mário Torres (13 September 1931 – 4 June 2020 in Coimbra) was a Portuguese footballer who played as a midfielder.

== Football career ==
Torres gained 5 caps for Portugal and made his debut on 22 December 1957 in Milan against Italy, in a 0–3 defeat.
