= Madalena Barbosa =

Portuguese politician

- Born: 13 March 1942
- Died: 21 February 2008 (aged 65)
- Known for: Founder of the Movement for the Liberation of Women

Madalena Barbosa (13 March 1942 – 21 February 2008) was the founder of the Movement for the Liberation of Women (Movimento de Libertação das Mulheres), in April 1974, created to "fight for the right to equality of opportunity without discrimination of gender".

== Biography ==
In 1980, Madalena Barbosa joined the Commission on the Status of Women, Commission for Citizenship and Gender Equality. In the interim election of 2007 she was a candidate for the Municipal Chamber of Lisbon by the left-wing Citizens Movement for Lisbon (Movimento Cidadãos por Lisboa).

In the course of her career, the activist represented Portugal and the European Union in various summits and international conferences, particularly in New York City. Madalena Barbosa self-identified as "feminist, socialist and woman", called a "gender expert" in other places in the world.

Madalena Barbosa died a day before the launch of Que Força é Essa ("What Force Is This"), her chronicle of reflection on issues such as feminism and studies of gender equality, civic participation and politics. The work was launched in the Fábrica Braço de Prata in Lisbon, as a final tribute.
