= Manuel Cargaleiro =

Portuguese artist (1927–2024)

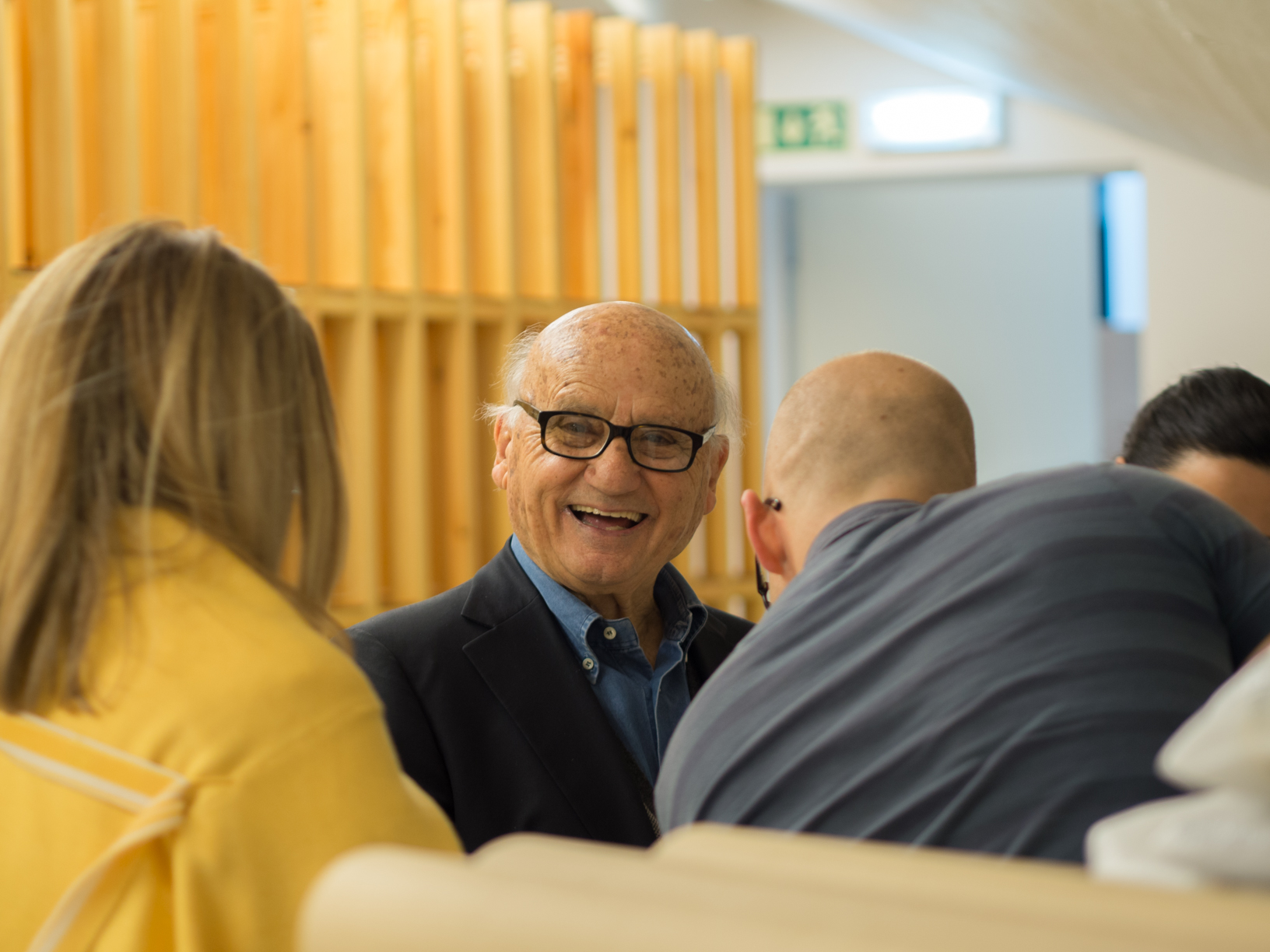
Cargaleiro in 2015

Manuel Cargaleiro (16 March 1927 – 30 June 2024) was a Portuguese artist who created ceramics and painting. Cargaleiro learned as an autodidact. He produced earthenware squares, the Portuguese Azulejo, an art that still has its importance in Portugal, and had been brought by the Arabs to the Iberian Peninsula.

He settled in France in 1957, a country which became his home. He was influenced by artists from the École de Paris, such as Robert Delaunay, Max Ernst, Victor Vasarely, and Paul Klee . His compositions are based on geometrical modules and primary colors, suggesting movement in space.

Cargaleiro received awards and decorations in Portugal, France, and Italy. In 1995 the artist created frescos for the subway station Champs-Elysées Clémenceau in Paris. He also worked for the Museum Manuel Cargaleiro in Castelo Branco, Seixal and Ravello. He received recognition and honor both in France and in his native Portugal.

In 2004, the inauguration of the Foundation-Museum Manuel Cargaleiro, Museum Manuel Cargaleiro took place, to which the artist made donations of works. This place is an important centre for the art of ceramics.

Cargaleiro lived and worked in Paris. He died on 30 June 2024, at the age of 97.

== See also ==
- Azulejo
