= Danilo Plessow =

German DJ and music producer

Danilo Plessow is a music producer and DJ (born c. 1985), perhaps best known for his work as the alias Motor City Drum Ensemble (MCDE). Raised in the German town of Schwäbisch Gmünd, Plessow played drums from the age of 6 years old and began creating his own music using a computer and samples from the age of 11. Musical influences include Moodymann, Marvin Gaye, 70s jazz and 90s hiphop including early J Dilla and Pete Rock. In his formative years he would travel into the nearby city of Stuttgart to collect vinyl records. The alias Motor City Drum Ensemble is a nod to his Detroit musical influences as well as referencing Stuttgart (home of Mercedes Benz and Porsche) and his collection of drum machines.

Plessow is famed for the Raw Cuts series and has released singles and remixes on over twenty record labels. He has also co-founded labels such as MCDE Recordings, Four Roses Recordings and Space Grape Records, the latter of which is focused on live contemporary music, such as with Jéroboam, musicians from Kyoto Jazz Massive.

As an international DJ he frequently travels around the world to perform at clubs and festivals.

He was a radio presenter for Gilles Peterson's Worldwide FM and was a curator for Nuits Sonores in Lyon 2016.

Other aliases: Inverse Cinematics, Vermont, Jayson Brothers and Basic-Variation.
