= Gonçalves Isabelinha =

Portuguese footballer and ophthalmologist

- Born: Joaquim Duarte Gonçalves Isabelinha; 5 December 1908; Almeirim, Portugal
- Died: 24 November 2009 (aged 100)
- Education: University of Coimbra
- Occupations: footballer, ophthalmologist
- Known for: played for Académica de Coimbra

Joaquim Duarte Gonçalves Isabelinha (5 December 1908 – 24 November 2009) was a Portuguese footballer for Académica de Coimbra and a medical doctor.

Born to a relatively modest family in Almeirim, Portugal, at a time that study at the secondary school aiming the university admission was considered a luxury in Portugal, Isabelinha studied at the Liceu de Santarém (secondary school in Santarém), between 1922 and 1930, playing football for Leões de Santarém team.

In Coimbra, at the Faculty of Medicine of the University of Coimbra, where he graduated in 1936, he played for Académica de Coimbra and is still remembered today. Professionally, he qualified as a medical ophthalmologist in 1940.

== Sources ==
- Article on Gonçalves Isabelinha's 100th birthday (in Portuguese)
- Report about Gonçalves Isabelinha's death at 100 (in Portuguese)
