= List of Spanish films of the 2000s =

Films produced in Spain in the 2000s (decade) ordered by year of release on separate pages:

== List of films by year ==
- Spanish films of 2000
- Spanish films of 2001
- Spanish films of 2002
- Spanish films of 2003
- Spanish films of 2004
- Spanish films of 2005
- Spanish films of 2006
- Spanish films of 2007
- Spanish films of 2008
- Spanish films of 2009
