= 2007 in Portugal =

- Decades: 1980s; 1990s; 2000s; 2010s; 2020s
- See also: History of Portugal; Timeline of Portuguese history; List of years in Portugal

The year 2007 in Portugal.

== Incumbents ==
- President: Aníbal Cavaco Silva
- Prime Minister: José Sócrates (Socialist)

== Events ==
=== May ===
- May 3: Disappearance of Madeleine McCann, in Praia da Luz, Algarve.
- May 29: Prime Minister José Sócrates visits Russia.
- May 30: General strike.

=== June ===
- June 25: Opening of the Berardo Museum in Lisbon.

=== July ===
- July 1: Beginning of the Portuguese presidency of the European Union.
- July 4: The 1st EU-Brazil summit takes place in Lisbon.
- July 15: Local elections in Lisbon. António Costa is elected mayor.

=== September ===
- September 28: Luís Filipe Menezes wins the elections in PSD and become the leader of the main opposition party.

=== October ===
- October 25: Visit of the President of Russia Vladimir Putin to Portugal.
- October 26: EU-Russia summit in Mafra.

=== November ===
- November 5: A road accident on Auto-estrada A23, in the municipality of Vila Velha de Ródão, killed 15 people and injured 22.

=== December ===
- December 8 - December 9: Africa-EU Summit.
- December 13: Signing of the Treaty of Lisbon.

== Arts & literature ==
=== Film ===
- October 25: Premiere of A Outra Margem.

== Sport ==
- May 20: F.C. Porto wins the football championship.
- May 26: Ovarense wins the basketball championship.
- May 27: Sporting C.P. wins the football cup final against C.F. Os Belenenses.

== Deaths ==
- January 19: Fiama Hasse Pais Brandão
- January 23: A. H. de Oliveira Marques
- March 1: Manuel Bento
- March 26: João Soares Louro (pt)
- May 21: Alberto Vilaça
- July 4: Henrique Viana
- July 15: Alberto Romão Dias
- August 25: Eduardo Prado Coelho
- August 27: Alberto de Lacerda
- October 9: Fausto Correia

== See also ==
- List of Portuguese films of 2007
