= 2009 swine flu pandemic in Portugal =

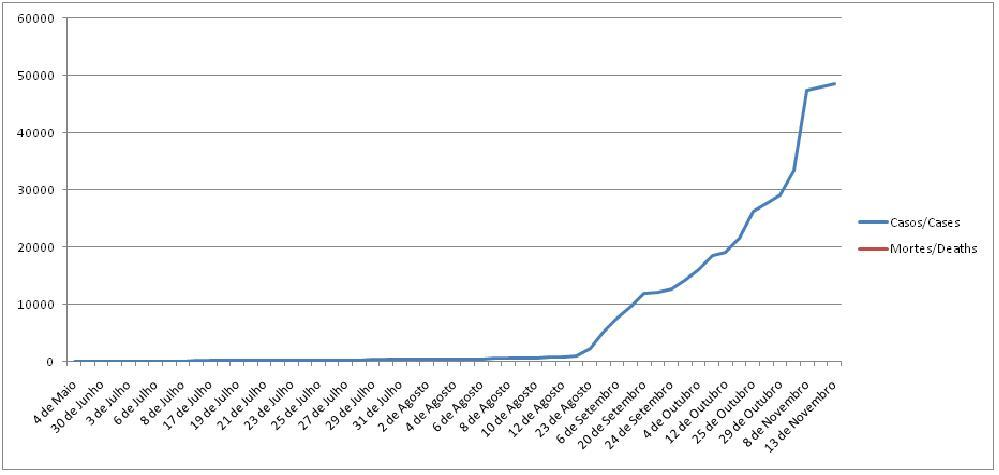
Graph of cases and deaths in Portugal

The 2009 flu pandemic, an influenza outbreak commonly known as "swine flu", affected Portugal from May 2009 to early 2010. The outbreak caused 122 deaths in the country.

== Course of the outbreak ==
On 4 May, there was one confirmed case in Lisbon, Portugal, but it did not represent any concern, because the risk of transmission was no longer present at that time.

On 1 June, Ana Jorge, the Portuguese Health Minister, confirmed the second case in Portugal, a 33-year-old man who travelled from the United States, first landing in Frankfurt, Germany. The case was reported at São João Hospital, Porto. On 30 June, five new cases were announced in Portugal elevating the total number of cases to 18.

The first known cases resulting from human-to-human transmission were reported on 4 July (one in Azores, and the other one in Lisbon). On 7 July, the first school was closed down for prevention, in Lisbon, as well as a kindergarten in Azores. The next day the first case was confirmed in the Braga district, making the total cases 61. As of 14 July, there were a total of 96 confirmed cases in Portugal. On this day, it was also announced that Faro's Hospital would join, on 15 July, the set of hospitals in the country capable of receiving patients infected with the A/H1N1 flu virus. Total cases rose to 154 on 20 July.

Government officials stated that the worst-case scenario in Portugal would be 25% infection with a mortality of 0.1%, i.e. 8700 deaths.

The outbreak started to spread more rapidly in September; on the 13th, Portugal had 9618 cases officially confirmed. The first death was reported on 23 September. By 28 October, there had been four deaths - two men, one woman and one child - and there were more than 25,000 cases confirmed. As of 4 December, there were 121,677 cases confirmed and 24 deaths. The final death toll, reported in May 2010, was 122.
