= Portuguese Natural Gas Association =

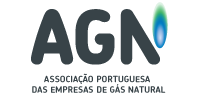
- AGN logo
- Formation: 2010
- Headquarters: Lisbon, Portugal
- Members: 27 Associate Members that represent the majority of national entities in the areas of transport, storage, LNG, and distribution and commercialization of natural gas.
- President: Fabrizio Dassogno
- Executive Director: António Pires
- Website: http://agnatural.pt/

The Portuguese Natural Gas Association, founded in December 2010, is a non-profit association, based in Lisbon, Portugal. Its bylaws define AGN as a scientific, technical and professional association, establishing itself as the representative body for the sector.

== Organization ==
=== Governing Board ===
The Governing Board is the association's highest representative body, and fulfills decisions made in the General Assembly. The Governing Board is formed by seven to nine members elected in the General Assembly: one President, two Vice-Presidents, and, variably, four to six advisors. The Governing Board will be assembled as many times as considered necessary and has at least one meeting per month.

=== Standing Committees and Working Committees ===
AGN has two Standing Committees formed by specialists of associated companies; one is dedicated to natural gas infra-structure issues, and the other to retail issues. Other working committees may be established for specific issues. The committees are a permanent part of AGN's Governing Body.
