= List of Portuguese films of 2007 =

A list of Portuguese films that were first released in 2007.

| Release date | Title | Director | Cast | Genre | Notes | Ref |
|---|---|---|---|---|---|---|
| January 11 | Body Rice | Hugo Vieira da Silva | | | 2.946 admissions | |
| March 8 | Brava Dança | Jorge Pires, José Câmara | | | 1.158 admissions | |
| March 15 | Suícidio Encomendado | Artur Serra Araújo | | | 2.829 admissions | |
| April 5 | Dot.com | Luís Galvão Teles | | | 27.915 admissions | |
| May 3 | O Mistério da Estrada de Sintra | Jorge Paixão da Costa | | | 29.193 admissions | |
| May 31 | Atrás das Nuvens | Jorge Queiroga | | | 9.529 admissions | |
| July 5 | Belle Toujours | Manoel de Oliveira | | | 4.096 admissions | |
| September 20 | The Golden Helmet | Jorge Cramez | | | 5.149 admissions | |
| October 11 | Trial | Leonel Vieira | | | 10.706 admissions | |
| October 25 | The Other Side | Luís Filipe Rocha | | | 12.088 admissions | |
| November 1 | Corrupção | João Botelho | | | 228.481 admissions | |
| December 20 | Floripes | Miguel Gonçalves Mendes | | | 2.230 admissions | |
| December 27 | Call Girl | António-Pedro Vasconcelos | | | 55.579 admissions | |

== See also ==
- 2007 in Portugal
