= 1929 in Portugal =

- Decades: 1900s; 1910s; 1920s; 1930s; 1940s
- See also: History of Portugal; Timeline of Portuguese history; List of years in Portugal

Events in the year 1929 in Portugal.

== Incumbents ==
- President: Óscar Carmona
- Prime Minister: José Vicente de Freitas (Independent) (until 8 July); Artur Ivens Ferraz (Independent) (from 8 July)

== Events ==
- 8 July – Artur Ivens Ferraz takes over as Prime Minister, succeeding José Vicente de Freitas

== Sports ==
- Atlético S.C. founded
- Eléctrico F.C. founded
- Pedrouços A.C. founded

== Births ==
- 23 December – Alberto da Costa Pereira, footballer (d. 1990).

== Deaths ==
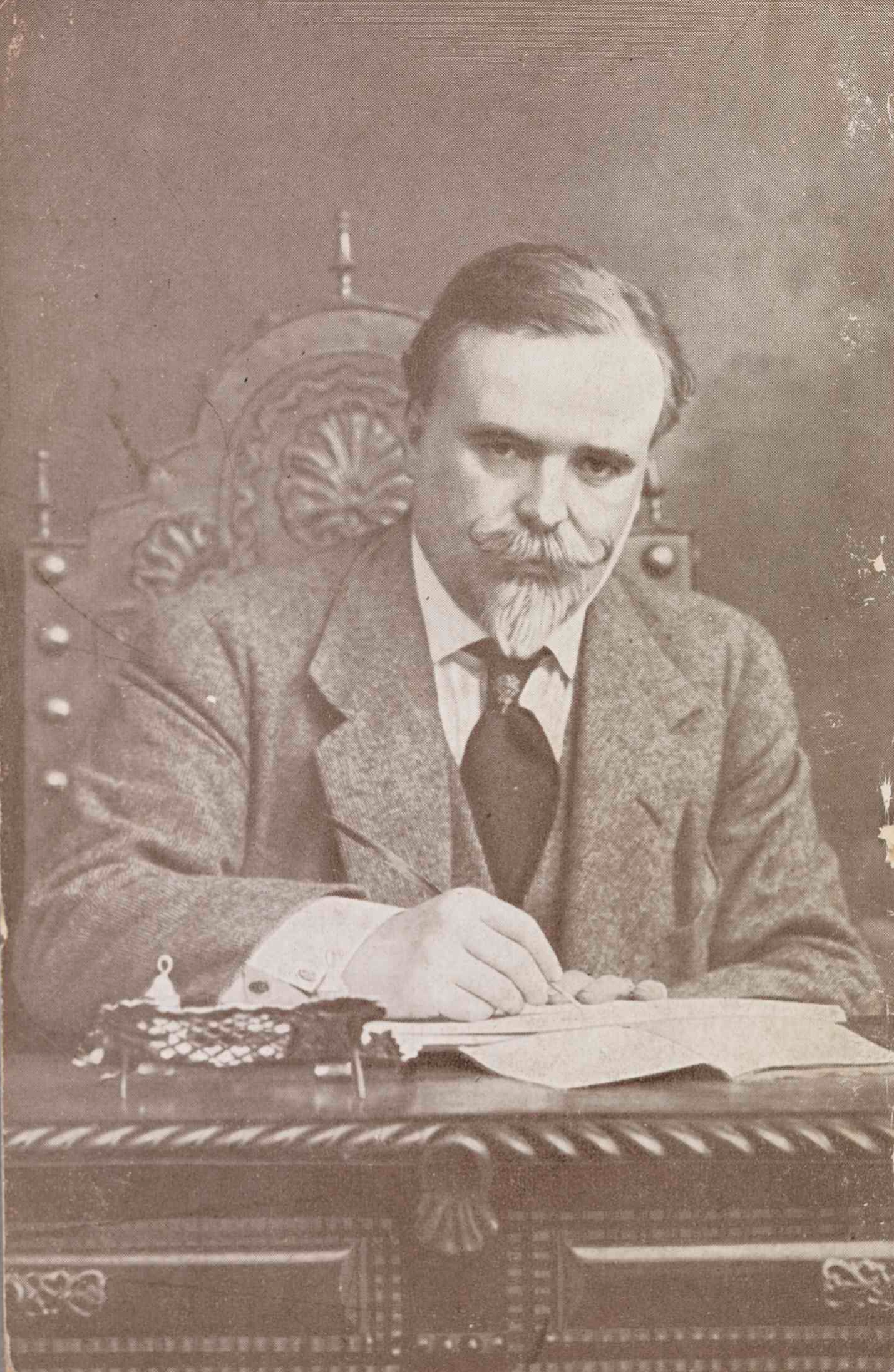
António José de Almeida

- 4 April – João Franco, politician (born 1855)
- 31 July – José de Castro, lawyer, journalist and politician (born 1868)
- 31 October – António José de Almeida, politician (born 1866)
- 31 October – José Relvas, land owner and politician (born 1858)
- 17 December – Manuel de Oliveira Gomes da Costa, military officer and politician (born 1863)
