= List of Portuguese films of 2003 =

A list of Portuguese films that were first released in 2003.

Release date	Title	Director	Cast	Genre	Notes	Ref
March 21	The Woman Who Believed She Was President of the USA?	João Botelho				
April 25	A Filha	Solveig Nordlund				
May 30	Night Passage	Luís Filipe Rocha				
May 30	The Policewoman	Joaquim Sapinho				
June 20	Come and Go	João César Monteiro				
September 12	O Rapaz do Trapézio Voador	Fernando Matos Silva				
September 26	Preto e Branco	José Carlos de Oliveira				
October 3	Lent	José Álvaro de Morais				
October 17	A Talking Picture	Manoel de Oliveira				
November 7	The Immortals	António-Pedro Vasconcelos				
November 28	Us	Cláudia Tomaz				
December 26	Fascination	José Fonseca e Costa				

== See also ==
- 2003 in Portugal
