= Francisco Rocha =

Portuguese footballer (born 1927)

Personal information
- Full name: Francisco Pedro de Conceição Rocha
- Date of birth: 9 April 1927
- Place of birth: Funchal, Madeira, Portugal
- Position: Defender

Senior career*
Years	Team	Apps	(Gls)
- Belenenses

International career
1952	Portugal	1	(0)
- * Club domestic league appearances and goals

Francisco Pedro de Conceição Rocha (born 9 April 1927) is a Portuguese former footballer who played as a defender.
