= 2004 in Portugal =

- Decades: 1980s; 1990s; 2000s; 2010s; 2020s
- See also: History of Portugal; Timeline of Portuguese history; List of years in Portugal

Events in the year 2004 in Portugal.

== Incumbents ==
- President: Jorge Sampaio
- Prime Minister: Jose Manuel Barroso (Social Democratic) (until 17 July); Pedro Santana Lopes (Social Democratic) (from 17 July)

== Arts and entertainment ==
=== Film ===
- 21 October – In the Darkness of the Night released.

== Sports ==
Football (soccer) competitions: Primeira Liga, Liga de Honra

== Deaths ==
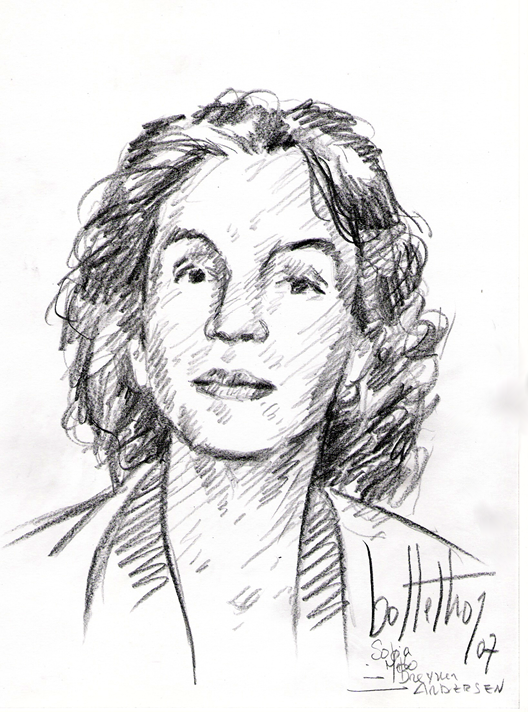
Sophia de Mello Breyner Andresen

- 2 February – Kaúlza de Arriaga, military officer (born 1915)
- 12 May – Álvaro Cardoso, football player (born 1914)
- 2 July – Sophia de Mello Breyner Andresen, poet (born 1919).
- 10 July – Maria de Lourdes Pintasilgo, chemical engineer and politician (born 1930)

== See also ==
- List of Portuguese films of 2004
