= 2010 Portuguese general strike =

The 2010 Portuguese general strike occurred on 24 November, 2010 across Portugal. It was the first general strike in Portugal since 1988. An estimated 3 million workers took part in the protest which was aimed at the XVIII Constitutional Government of Portugal's austerity measures. It took place during the ongoing financial crisis.

The strike was called on 3 October and both the General Union of Workers (UGT) and General Confederation of Labour (CGTP) took part.

An estimated 80% of trains did not run.
