= To Die like a Man =

2009 film

- Theatrical release poster
- Directed by: João Pedro Rodrigues
- Written by: João Pedro Rodrigues
- Produced by: Maria João Sigalho; Judith Nora
- Starring: Fernando Santos; Chandra Malatitch; Miguel Loureiro; Jenny Larue; Fernando Gomes
- Cinematography: Rui Poças
- Release date: 22 May 2009 (Portugal)
- Running time: 134 minutes
- Country: Portugal
- Language: Portuguese

To Die like a Man (Portuguese: Morrer Como Um Homem) is a 2009 Portuguese drama film directed by João Pedro Rodrigues, produced by the production company Rosa Filmes.

== Cast ==
In order of appearance:

- Chandra Malatitch as Zé Maria
- John Romão as Mendes
- Ivo Barroso as Cardoso
- Gonçalo Ferreira de Almeida as Maria Bakker
- Miguel Loureiro as Paula
- Francisco Peres as the Plastic Surgeon
- Fernando Santos as Tonia
- Cindy Scrash as Irene
- Carloto Cotta as Carlos
- Jenny Larrue as Jenny
- Gonçalo Mendes as Sérgio
- Alexander David as Rosário
- Fernando Gomes as Teixeira
- André Murraças as Dr. Felgueiras
- Amândio Coroado as the Hospital Doctor
- Marco Paiva as the Nurse

== Awards and nominations ==
It competed in the Un Certain Regard section at the 2009 Cannes Film Festival. It was selected as the Portuguese entry for the Best Foreign Language Film at the 83rd Academy Awards but it didn't make the final shortlist.

== Critical reception ==
Critical reception has been mixed. Variety.com's Leslie Felperin stated that he disliked the film's excessive running time (138'), that too much of the time is taken up by music and singing, feeling that the movie and storyline were unremarkable. However, the movie was voted "Best Undistributed Film" of 2009 in the Village Voice's 10th Annual Film Critics' Poll. "A fabulously sad fable about a Fado-singing, pooch-pampering trannie growing old, [To Die Like a Man] is also a piece of lyrical, playful, unpredictable filmmaking," wrote film critic J. Hoberman. The film seventh on Cahiers du cinéma's list of the best films of 2010. Keith Uhlich of Time Out New York named To Die Like a Man the seventh-best film of 2011, calling it a "quiet heartbreaker."

== See also ==
- List of submissions to the 83rd Academy Awards for Best Foreign Language Film
- List of Portuguese submissions for the Academy Award for Best Foreign Language Film
