= List of Azerbaijani films of the 2010s =

A list of the most recent films produced in Azerbaijan ordered by year of release in the 2010s:

== 2010s ==
Title	Director	Cast	Genre	Notes
2010
The Precinct	Ilgar Safat	Zaza Bejashvili, Melissa Papel, Vagif Ibrahimoglu		
2011
Buta	Ilgar Najaf			
2012
Steppe Man	Shamil Aliyev			
Amazing Azerbaijan	Liz Mermin		Documentary	UK, Azerbaijan, German co-production
2014
Down the River	Asif Rustamov		Drama	
Endless Corridor	Aleksandras Brokas		Documentary	
Man Eva Qayidiram	Samir Karimoghlu		War	
Nabat	Elchin Musaoglu			
Nobody Likes Us But We Don't Care	Jordan Baseman		Documentary	
Porter & Co.	Collin Kriner		Documentary	
Retour au Caucase: Gérard Depardieu dans les pas d'Alexandre Dumas	Stéphane Bergouhnioux		Documentary	
Saving Papua by Not Cycling There	Florian Augustin		Documentary	
Seçim	Shahin Khalil		Drama	
T of Generation Baku, Contradictions	Orkhan Ata		Documentary	
2017
Pomegranate Orchard	Ilgar Najaf			
