= Azerbaijanfilm =

Azerbaijani state-owned film company

- Type: JSC
- Industry: Motion pictures Animated films
- Founded: 16 April 1920; 106 years ago
- Headquarters: Baku, Azerbaijan
- Key people: director generale Gurban Primov
- Products: Motion pictures Television programs
- Owner: Government of Azerbaijan

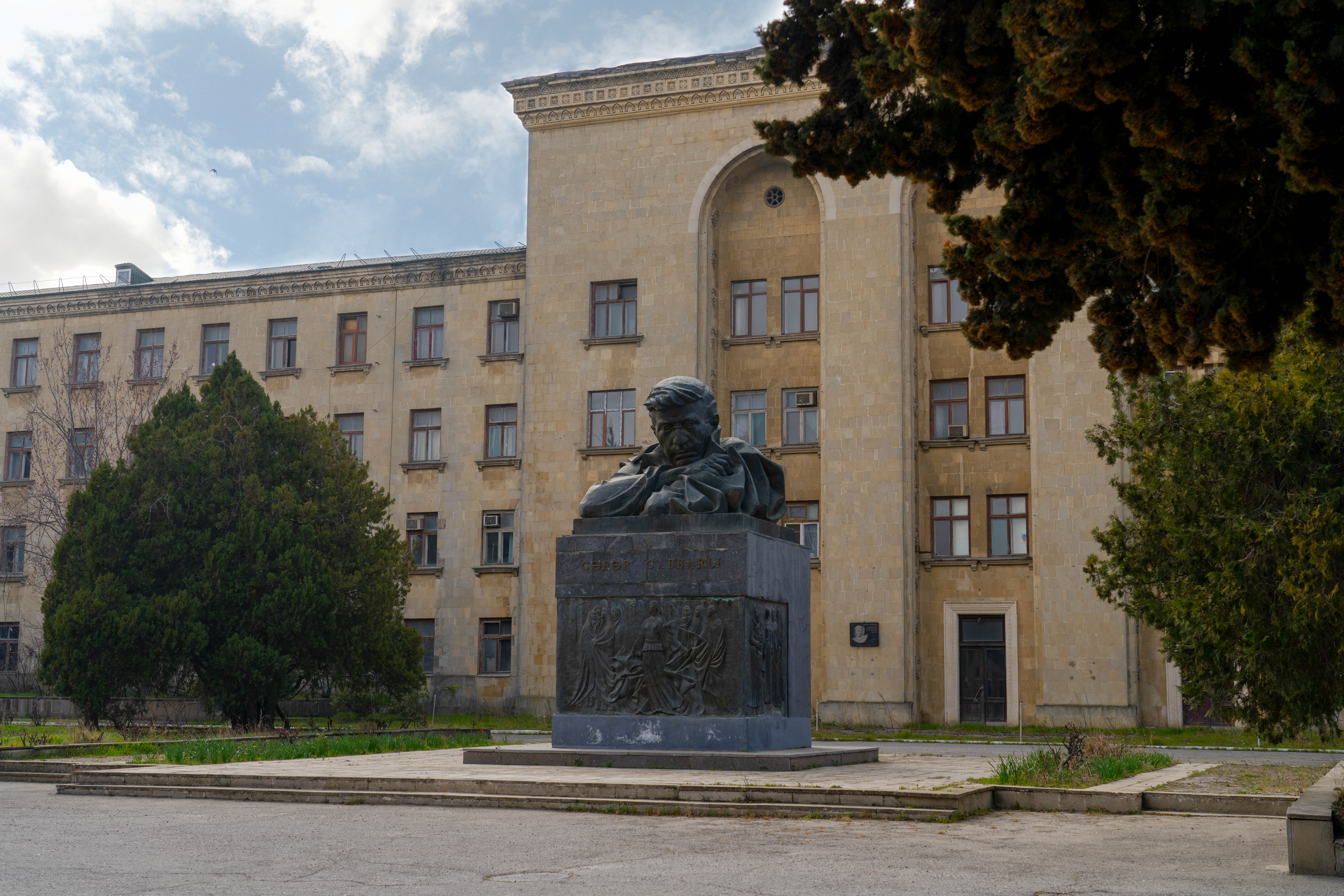
Main entrance to Azerbaijanfilm studio

Azerbaijanfilm (Azerbaijani: Azərbaycanfilm) is an Azerbaijani state-owned film production company. It is one of the oldest film studios in Azerbaijan.

Azerbaijanfilm was originally established in 1920 as a photo-cinema department at the Azerbaijan SSR's People's Commissariat, and was renamed to the Azerbaijani Photo-Cinema Office (AFKI) in 1923. It then went through several name changes, including Azdovletkino (1926–1930), Azkino (1930–1933), Azfilm (1933), Azdovletkinosenaye (1934), Azerfilm (1935–1940), and Baku Cinema Studio (1941–1959), before adopting its present name in 1960 as Azerbaijanfilm cinema studio in honour of Jafar Jabbarly. Currently, Azerbaijanfilm is a part of the Ministry of Culture and Tourism of Azerbaijan, and is located in the capital Baku.

== Notable films ==
=== Azerbaijan SSR ===
- 1931 Qaz
- 1933 Lökbatan
- 1945 The Cloth Peddler
- 1956 O Olmasin, Bu Olsun
- 1961 Balıqçılar
- 1963 Kür
- 1964 İçəri Şəhər
- 1964 Ulduz
- 1965 Mingəçevir
- 1970 Sevil
- 1977 Birthday
- 1979 Babek
- 1988 The Scoundrel
- 1989 Anecdote

=== Azerbaijan ===
- 1991 The Engagement Ring
- 1998 Sari Gelin
- 2001 The Dream
- 2004 National Bomb
- 2009 The 40th Door
- 2010 The Precinct
- 2011 Buta
- 2012 Amazing Azerbaijan (documentary)
- 2012 Steppe Man
- 2014 Nabat

== See also ==
- Azerbaijani animation
- Cinema of Azerbaijan
- List of Azerbaijani films
