= List of Azerbaijani films =

A complete list of films produced in the country of Azerbaijan ordered by year of release and decade on separate pages:

- List of Azerbaijani films before 1920
- List of Azerbaijani films of the 1920s
- List of Azerbaijani films of the 1930s
- List of Azerbaijani films of the 1940s
- List of Azerbaijani films of the 1950s
- List of Azerbaijani films of the 1960s
- List of Azerbaijani films of the 1970s
- List of Azerbaijani films of the 1980s
- List of Azerbaijani films of the 1990s
- List of Azerbaijani films of the 2000s
- List of Azerbaijani films of the 2010s
- List of Azerbaijani films of the 2020s

== See also ==
- List of films declared state property of Azerbaijan
