= Azerbaijani animation =

The history of Azerbaijani animation is so far a nearly unexplored field for Western film theory and history. Most of Azerbaijan's production of animation for cinema and television was created during Soviet times. A lengthy history interlocks between the art, politics and the ever-changing economy.

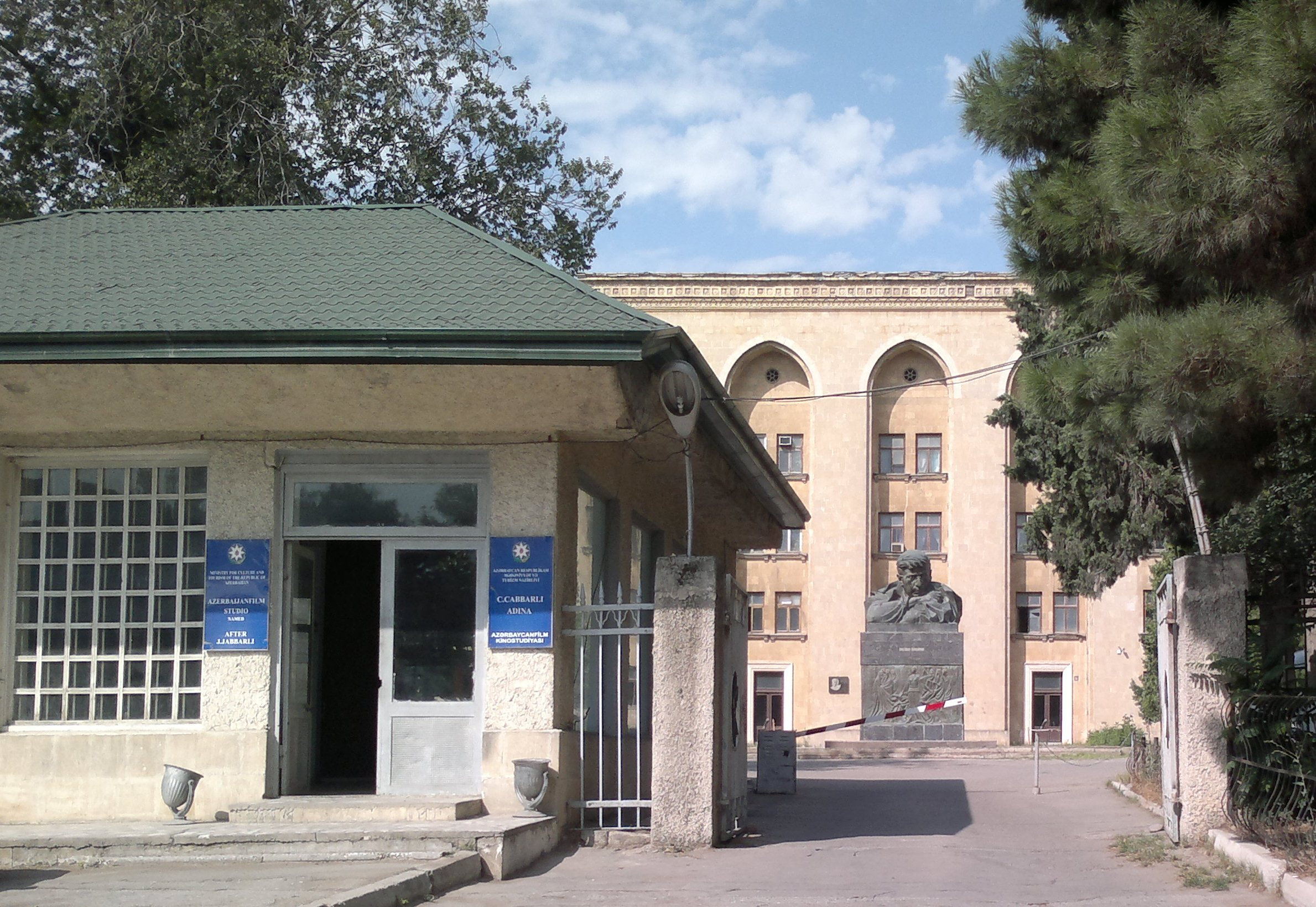
Entrance to Azerbaijanfilm's studio in Baku

== History ==
=== Soviet era ===
The creation of animation film in Azerbaijan goes back to the early 1930s. In 1933, employees of Azerbaijanfilm studio purchased necessary materials from Moscow. The same year, they used technical animation in production of the documentaries Lokbatan and Oil Symphony. In 1938, the educational film Jat was the first full-length work where animation was fully used.

After the release of Jat, a group of artists decided to make an animated film in the film studio for the first time.

The theme for the film was taken from Azerbaijani folk tales. The scenery called "Abbasın bədbəxtliyi" (Abbas's unhappiness) was written by A. Papov. The animation film was directed by E.Dikaryov. The animation work was done by artists G. Khalykov, J. Zeynalov, M.Magomayev and A. Mirzayev. The film operator was Q. Yegiazarov.

The studio would go on to create animation for hundreds of scientific, documentary and documentary films. In the creation of these films, actors J. Zeynalov, M. Rafiev, A. Akhundov, N. Mammadov, B. Aliyev, and A. Milov took parts.

=== Republic era ===
After the dissolution of the USSR, the situation for Azerbaijan animators changed dramatically. In the 90s, Azanfilm made 19 animation films, including Bir dəfə haradasa... (Once somewhere...), Oda (Ode), Göyçək Fatma (Lovely Fatma), Karvan (Caravan), Sohbatul-Esmar.

In 1991, cell animation İthaf (Dedication), which was dedicated to the victims of Stalin repression was awarded the diploma of Oberhauzen International Film Festival, the most successful debut prize of Kiev KROK-91 International Animation Film Federation (ASIFA) Festival and the best animation film prize of Vision from East Baku International Film Festival.

In the 2000s, Azerbaijani animation entered a new crisis as all channels in Azerbaijan indefinitely postponed funding for all projects. In 2008, Azerbaijani ministry of culture and tourism celebrated the 75th birthday of Azerbaijani animation.

In 2018, the first professional animated series in the history of Azerbaijan was created by "Crambone" studio. The animated series called "Balta" (axe) was written and directed by Ravan Muradov and drawn by Amrah Niyazali. The 10-episode series was released on the YouTube platform and became popular on social media.

== Azerbaijan Animation Museum ==
The Azerbaijan Animation Museum was established in 2015 with the support of the Youth Foundation under the President of the Republic of Azerbaijan and the Ministry of Culture and Tourism of Azerbaijan, and at the initiative of the Azerbaijani Consulate of Art. The museum is named after Nazim Mammadov, the founder of the Azerbaijani animation film.

Nazim Mammadov has worked for the film studio named after Jafar Jabbarli for many years and became the founder of the Azerbaijani animation. He has also been involved in painting, graphics and illustrations to more than 400 children's books. The creation of the museum is aimed at educating young people about the history of Azerbaijan's animation.

The museum contains a database on the history of Azerbaijani animation from the 1960 to 1990s.

== See also ==
- Azerbaijanfilm
- Lists of Azerbaijani films
