= List of Azerbaijani submissions for the Academy Award for Best International Feature Film =

Best International Feature Film submissions from Azerbaijan

Highlights
- Debut: 2007
- Submissions: 11
- Nominations: none
- Oscar winners: none

Azerbaijan has submitted films for the Academy Award for Best International Feature Film (Note: The category was previously named the Academy Award for Best Foreign Language Film, but this was changed to the Academy Award for Best International Feature Film in April 2019, after the Academy deemed the word "Foreign" to be outdated.) since 2007. The Academy Award for Best Foreign Language Film is handed out annually by the United States Academy of Motion Picture Arts and Sciences to a feature-length motion picture produced outside the United States that contains primarily non-English dialogue. It was not created until the 1956 Academy Awards, in which a competitive Academy Award of Merit, known as the Best Foreign Language Film Award, was created for non-English speaking films, and has been given annually since.

As of 2026, Azerbaijan has submitted eleven films, but none of them were nominated.

== Submissions ==
The Academy of Motion Picture Arts and Sciences has invited the film industries of various countries to submit their best film for the Academy Award for Best International Feature Film since 1956. The International Feature Film Committee oversees the process and reviews all the submitted films. Following this, they vote via secret ballot to determine the five nominees for the award. Azerbaijan was first invited by AMPAS to submit a film in the summer of 2006, and submitted for the first time in 2007.

All the films submitted are primary in Azerbaijani. Below is a list of the films that have been submitted by Azerbaijan by year, and its respective Academy Awards ceremony:

Year (Ceremony)	Film title used in nomination	Original title	Director(s)	Result
2007 (80th)	Caucasia	Qafqaz	Farid Gumbatov	Not nominated
2008 (81st)	Fortress	Qala	Shamil Najafzadeh	Not nominated
2010 (83rd)	The Precinct	Sahə	Ilgar Safat	Not nominated
2012 (85th)	Buta	Buta	Ilgar Najaf	Not nominated
2013 (86th)	Steppe Man	Çölçü	Shamil Aliyev	Not nominated
2014 (87th)	Nabat	Nabat	Elchin Musaoğlu	Not nominated
2017 (90th)	Pomegranate Orchard	Nar bağı	Ilgar Najaf	Not nominated
2021 (94th)	The Island Within	Daxildəki Ada	Ru Hasanov	Not nominated
2022 (95th)	Creators	Yaradanlar	Shamil Aliyev	Not nominated
2025 (98th)	Taghiyev: Oil	Tağiyev: Neft	Zaur Gasimli	Not nominated
2026 (99th)	Taghiyev: School	Tağıyev: Məktəb	Zaur Gasimli	Pending

== See also ==
- List of Academy Award winners and nominees for Best International Feature Film
- List of Academy Award-winning foreign language films
- Cinema of Azerbaijan
