= Vidadi Hasanov =

Azerbaijani actor

- Vidadi Həsənov
- Born: July 16, 1958 (age 67); Ganja, Azerbaijan
- Occupation: Actor

Vidadi Ismayil oglu Hasanov (born July 16, 1958, Kirovabad) is an Azerbaijani actor and screenwriter who has worked extensively both in theater and film productions in his country.

== Early life and education ==
Vidadi Hasanov was born on July 16, 1958, in Ganja. After completing his military service in 1979, he began working at the Ganja State Drama Theater named after Jafar Jabbarli. In 1980, he entered the Azerbaijan State Institute of Culture and Arts, majoring in drama and film actor. He participated as an actor in the institute's Educational Theater.

== Career ==
Hasanov began his career as a teacher at the same university in 1986.

He received an international certificate after completing a scriptwriting course in Tbilisi in 2009 and Moscow in 2010 under the auspices of the European Cinematographers Association.

Hasanov is the artistic director of "M. Teatr Production", in 2016.

== Awards ==
On July 31, 2019, he was awarded the honorary title of People's Artist of Azerbaijan for his services to the development of Azerbaijani cinema.

On May 7, 2021, and May 10, 2022, he was awarded the Presidential Award. On May 6, 2023, he was awarded a personal recognition from the President of the Republic of Azerbaijan for his services to the development of Azerbaijani culture.

== Filmography ==
- The Kidnapping of the Groom (film, 1985) — Musa
- Whirlwind (film, 1986) — Adil
- Notes of a Dervish (film, 2013)
- The Divan of the Conquerors — Attila
- The Fate of the Emperor (film, 2008) — Javad Khan
- Wait for the Sign from the Sea (film, 1986) — Adjutant
- The Tower (film, 2008) — Abil Muallim
- The Devil in Plain Sight (film, 1987) — Poacher
- Sabotage (film, 1989) — Police Major
- Lie (film, 2005) — Assistant
- Sleep Memory (film, 2008)
- Leyli and Majnun — Leyli's father
- The Deserter (film, 2012) — Elder Deserter (also screenwriter)
- Room 220 (screenwriter)
- The Seagull (2012)
- Steppe Man (2011) (also screenwriter) — Ulu
- Don't Be afraid When You're Alone… (TV series, 2013)
- The Inner City (film, 2015)
- Path of Light (film, 2015)
- Second Bullet (film, 2017)
- Father's Hearth (TV series, 2017)
- The Last Act (film, 2019)
- The Island Within (film, 2020)
- Olympia (film, 2021)
- Woman (film, 2020)
- Vidaamuyarchi (film, 2025, India) — Omar
