= List of Azerbaijani films of the 1940s =

A list of earliest films produced in Azerbaijan SSR ordered by year of release in the 1940s:

Films:1918–1990 see also List of Soviet films

== 1940s ==
Title	Director	Cast	Genre	Notes
1940
Ankilostomidoz				
Azadlıq və Sevinc Bayramı				
Flight of the Weeping Sparrow (Pt. 3 of 5)				
Bakı Bolşevikləri				
Bakı Hazırdır				
Böyük Oktyabr Sosialist İnqilabının XXIII İldönümü				
DQMV Qabaqcılları Ümumittifaq Kənd Təsərrüfatı Sərgisində				
Hava Həyəcanı Siqnalı ilə				
Hava Hücumundan Müdafiə				
İyirminci Bahar				
Qazmada Rejim				
Neft və Pambıq Respublikasında				
Samur-Dəvəçi Kanalı				
Yeni Həyat Vadisi				
Yeni Horizont				
Zaqatala (film)				
1941
Azərbaycan Coğrafiyası				
Beş Dəqiqəlik Konsert				
Bir May Bakısı				
Cənub Sərhədlərinin Keşiyində				
Dəniz Səyyahı Sindbadın Macəraları				
Mahnılar və Şerlər				
Nizami (film)				
Qayalardan Yol				
Səbuhi				
Vətən Oğlu				
1942
416-cı				
Azərbaycan Kolxozçusu, Tank Briqadası Yaradaq!				
Bəxtiyar				
Biz Bakını Müdafiə edirik				
İran Haqqında Oçerk				
Sovet Pəhləvanı				
Sovqat				
Vətənin Qüdrətini Möhkəmləndirək				
Yazıçılar Konfransı				
Zaqafqaziya Xalqlarının Dostluğu				
1943
Almanların Şimali Qafqazda Vəhşilikləri				
Bir Ailə				
Cəbhə Arxasında				
Qayğı				
SSRİ EA-nın Azərbaycan Filialı				
Sualtı Qayıq T-9				
Vətən Uğrunda				
1944
Bakı Döyüşür				
Bakı Neftçiləri				
Böyük Yol Haqqında Kino Hekayəti				
Cəfər Cabbarlı				
Dövlət Sığortası				
Xəzər Dənizçiləri				
Qardaşlıq Köməyi				
Qəzvinə Kömək				
Məktuba Cavab				
SSRİ-nin Himni				
Şəfa Nəğməsi				
Təbriz (film)				
Zaqafqaziya Müsəlmanları Ruhanilərinin Qurultayı				
1945
Arazın O Tayında Ərəb Şriftidir				
The Cloth Peddler (1945 film)				
Əbədi Odlar Ölkəsi				
General Həzi Aslanov				
İran				
İran Azərbaycanının Paytaxtında				
Qələbə Bayramı				
1946
Bakıda Tikinti				
Daşkəsən (film)				
Qırmızı Ordu Hissələrinin İrandan Yola salınması				
Topçubaşovun Aparatı				
1947
Arazın O Tayında				
Azərbaycan-Özbəkistan				
Bakıdan Göygölədək				
Fətəli Xan				
Xalq Nəğməkarı				
Qalib Ölkənin Bir Günü				
Qaliblər Adası				
Qocaman Həmkarlar İttifaqı				
Stalin Blokunun Yeni Qələbəsi				
Üzgüçülük üzrə SSRİ Birinciliyi				
1948
Axşam Konserti				
Azərbaycan Qurur				
Dağlıq Qarabağ				
Xəzər Nefti				
Sovet Azərbaycanı				
Sovet Gənclərinin Andı				
Yenikənd				
1949
25 İl Leninsiz				
Bakıda Stalinin Olduğu Yerlər				
Böyük Sərkərdə				
Böyük Yol				
Hədiyyə Xalçası				
Quba Bağlarında və Tərtərçay Vadisində				
Lenin Yolu ilə				
Mingəçevir (film)				
Rahatdır, Əlverişlidir, Etibarlıdır				
Sovet Naxçıvanı-Şərqin Qapısı				
Yeni Həyat Qurucuları				
