= Nariman Mammadov =

Azerbaijani film producer

- Born: Nəriman Kamileviç Məmmədov; July 10, 1969 (age 56); Moscow, RSFSR
- Occupations: Film producer; lawyer
- Awards: Honored cultural worker of the Republic of Azerbaijan

Nariman Kamilevich Mammadov (Azerbaijani: Nəriman Kamileviç Məmmədov; born July 10, 1969) is an Azerbaijani film producer, the chairman of the “Guild of Producers of the Republic of Azerbaijan”, CEO of "Narimanfilm" film company, board member of Union of Cinematographers of the Republic of Azerbaijan, and honored cultural worker of the Republic of Azerbaijan.

== Biography ==
Nariman Mammadov was born on July 10, 1969, in Moscow. He received higher juridical and military-political education. He has worked in managerial positions at various local and international companies for over 25 years. In June 2012 he was elected the Vice Chairman of the Guild of Producers of the Republic of Azerbaijan.

In 1994 he founded the film company "Narimanfilm". The company mainly deals with the production of documentary and feature films, legal, material-technical support for film projects in Azerbaijan and distribution of Azerbaijani films worldwide. He has been the producer of various, documentaries and feature films.

In September 2005 he became one of the founding members and member of the Board of "Independent Filmmakers' Association – South Caucasus" (IFA-SC). In October 2005 he was elected the first Chairman of the Board of the Association. In June 2012 he was elected the Vice Chairman of the Guild of Producers of the Republic of Azerbaijan. In July 2012 he became one of the founding members and member of the Board of Filmmakers’ Union of the Republic of Azerbaijan. On August 1, 2018, Nariman Mammadov was awarded the honorary title "Honored Worker of Culture of the Republic of Azerbaijan" by the decree of the President of the Republic of Azerbaijan.

Founder of “Salam International Youth Film Festival” which is founded on May 1, 2019.

On 27 November 2020 he was awarded the Global Film Festival Noida international award "For Excellence in Cinema".

On 19 October 2021 he became the chairman of the “Guild of Producers of the Republic of Azerbaijan”.

He is a producer of short and full-length feature films and documentaries.

== Awards ==
On August 1, 2018, Nariman Mammadov was awarded the honorary title of "Honored cultural worker of the Republic of Azerbaijan".

== Filmography ==
1. Thousand (2001, Moscow)
2. The Grandson of the Mountains (2002-2006, Baku)
3. I Remember the Bird (2002, Moscow)
4. On Green Pastures (2006, Baku)
5. Return to Gobustan (2007, Baku)
6. Peri Gala (2007, Baku)
7. My School (2008, Baku)
8. The Precinct (2010, Baku)
9. Passenger (2013, Baku)
10. Breaking the Silence (2013, Baku)
11. 9 x 9 (2013, Baku/Verona)
12. Second Bullet (2015)
13. Dog (2016, Baku)
14. Junga (2018, Baku/Tamil)
15. Kempegowda 2 (2019, Baku/Kannada)
16. Vinaya Vidheya Rama (2019, Baku/Telugu)
17. ABCD (2019, Baku/Telugu)
18. Nikhil Mudra (2019, Baku/Telugu)
19. “Action” (2019, Baku/ Tamil) - Line Producer
20. “90 ML” (2019, Baku/ Telugu) - Line Producer
21. “Oxemberg” TVC (2019, Baku/ Mumbai) - Line Producer
22. “Thalli Pogathey” (2019, Baku/ Tamil) - Line Producer
23. “Farida” (2020, Baku/ Saint Petersburg) - Producer
24. “Javoronki v repeynom pole” (2021, Baku/ Ulyanovsk) - Producer
