= Vidaamuyarchi =

2025 Indian film by Magizh Thirumeni

- Theatrical release poster
- Directed by: Magizh Thirumeni
- Screenplay by: Magizh Thirumeni
- Based on: Breakdown by Jonathan Mostow
- Produced by: Allirajah Subaskaran
- Starring: Ajith Kumar; Arjun Sarja; Trisha Krishnan; Regena Cassandrra; Arav
- Cinematography: Om Prakash (Note: Although Nirav Shah shot significant portions before the preliminary shooting, he was not credited in the promotional materials.)
- Edited by: N. B. Srikanth
- Music by: Anirudh Ravichander
- Production company: Lyca Productions
- Distributed by: See below
- Release date: 6 February 2025
- Running time: 150 minutes
- Country: India
- Language: Tamil
- Budget: ₹225–350 crore (Note: Vidaamuyarchi's reported budget varies between ₹225 crore (Zee News) and ₹350 crore (Dinamalar))
- Box office: est. ₹135.65–138 crore (Note: Vidaamuyarchi's reported worldwide gross varies between ₹135.65 crore (The Economic Times) and 138 crore (Hindustan Times; Business Today))

Vidaamuyarchi (transl. Perseverance) (Note: Marketed as விடாமுயற்சி: திருவினையாக்கும் in Tamil and Vidaamuyarchi: Perseverance Triumphs in English; along with the tagline Efforts Never Fail.) is a 2025 Indian Tamil-language action thriller film written and directed by Magizh Thirumeni. Inspired by the 1997 American film Breakdown, it is produced by Allirajah Subaskaran under Lyca Productions. The film stars Ajith Kumar, Arjun Sarja, Trisha Krishnan, Regena Cassandrra and Arav. In the film, a husband seeks to rescue his wife after she is captured by a mysterious group.

Initially, Vignesh Shivan was confirmed as the director of Ajith's 62nd film, before he was replaced by Magizh with a new script. After it was announced in May 2023 along with its official title, principal photography began that October. Shot mostly in Azerbaijan, with a short schedule in Thailand, filming wrapped by late December 2024. The film has music composed by Anirudh Ravichander, cinematography handled by Om Prakash and editing by N. B. Srikanth.

Vidaamuyarchi was initially scheduled to be released in January 2025, on the occasion of Pongal, but was postponed. The film was released in theatres on 6 February 2025 to mixed reviews from critics, who praised the lead cast's performance, visuals and action sequences, while the storyline and narration received criticism. Although the film underperformed at the box office, it became the highest-grossing Tamil film of 2025 by the end of its theatrical run, before being surpassed by Dragon (2025).

== Plot ==
Arjun and Kayal, a Tamil couple in Baku, are on the brink of divorce after twelve years of marriage. A flashback reveals they met in Tbilisi, fell in love, and married, but their relationship deteriorated after Kayal suffered a miscarriage that left her infertile and depressed. As emotional distance grew, Kayal began an affair with a man named Prakash and asked for a divorce. Arjun, heartbroken but respectful, agrees and offers to drive her to her parents’ home in Tbilisi.

During their trip, the couple have a hostile encounter with a group of men in a Hummer. At a filling station, Kayal befriends another Tamil couple, Deepika and Rakshith, who claim to be truckers. Later, when Arjun's car breaks down, Kayal leaves with Rakshith to seek help, but she goes missing. Arjun discovers the car was sabotaged and, failing to find Kayal at the café, confronts Rakshith — who denies knowing her. Though a police search turns up nothing, a local man later claims Kayal was kidnapped.

Arjun is ambushed by Rakshith's gang, including Deepika, the Hummer driver Michael, and the fake mentally impaired man. They claim Kayal hired them to kill Arjun and offer to switch targets for more money. Arjun pretends to agree, retrieves a knife, and escapes after attacking Michael. He later saves a police officer and learns Kayal might still be alive.

Meanwhile, the gang tries to trick Kayal into thinking Arjun wanted her killed. She resists. Arjun finds the hideout and kills or incapacitates most of the gang. Michael is killed with an electric saw, Deepika dies in an acid vat accident, and Rakshith kills himself by jumping into an industrial shredder after refusing to reveal Kayal's location.

Arjun discovers a hidden bunker with mutilated bodies. The police reveal the gang had been trafficking women after killing their husbands and surgically altering the wives. Kayal is found alive and rescued. She learns she was targeted for her husband's wealth, not her friend Anu.

Arjun drives Kayal to her parents. She asks why he risked everything despite her betrayal, and he replies, “Because I still love you.” They reconcile tearfully.

== Cast ==
Adapted from the closing credits:

- Ajith Kumar as Arjun M. (Note: His nameplate in Azerbaijani spells Arcun, since 'C' is pronounced as 'J' in the Azerbaijani script.)
- Arjun as Rakshith/Dheeraj
- Trisha as Kayal Arjun (Voice dubbed by Krithika Nelson)
- Regena Cassandrra as Deepika "Deeps" Rakshith (Voice dubbed by Andrea Jeremiah)
- Arav as Michael, Rakshith's gang member
- Ravi Raghavendra as Dr. Manohar Chandrasekhar
- Jeeva Ravi as Kayal's father
- Sandhya Janak as Kayal's mother
- Ramya Subramanian as Anu
- Nikhil Nair as Nikhil, Rakshith's gang member
- Ganesh Saravanan as Biju, Rakshith's gang member
- Devi Mahesh Rayan as Dr. Deepa Mathew (Note: Although the character was named 'Gynecologist' in the end credits, the name was revealed in the film.)
- Dasarathi Narasimhan as Das, Rakshith's gang member
- Vetri Kiran as Deepika's father
- Muthulakshmi Vaidyanathan as Deepika's mother
- Vidadi Hasanov as Omar
- Kazim Abdullayev as Jabbar
- Sveta Hakimova as Omar's mother
- Javanshir Hadiyev as Sheriff
- Rovshan Karimduxt as Deputy Majid
- Tural Ahmed as Rakshith's gang member
- Ilkin Hamidli as Jabbar's customer
- Sasan Asadi as Sarkhan Asadov
- Eres Metant Ahmedova as a Barfly
- Vusala Agayeva as Omar's Maid

== Production ==
=== Development ===
After the success of Valimai in early 2022, it was reported that Ajith Kumar would collaborate with director Vignesh Shivan for the actor's 62nd film as a leading actor. Nayanthara would reportedly reunite with Ajith after she was previously paired opposite the actor in Viswasam (2019). Tentatively titled AK62, the production was reported to begin after Ajith completed Thunivu (2023). That March, Vignesh confirmed the project, also revealing the inclusion of composer Anirudh Ravichander. The project was to be funded by Allirajah Subaskaran's Lyca Productions, which distributed Vignesh's Naanum Rowdy Dhaan (2015). The company made a public announcement on 19 March 2022, confirming the project. However, the following January, Vignesh was dropped from the project, reportedly because Ajith was not impressed with the script after the director had developed it during the pre-production for six months. Vignesh denied this reported reason in April 2023, saying he was dropped as only the producers, not Ajith, were not fully impressed with the script.

Numerous directors, including A. R. Murugadoss, Atlee and Magizh Thirumeni, were reported to be in consideration for replacing Vignesh, with Magizh being the front-runner. In February 2023, it was reported that Magizh had flown to London, where Ajith was at the time, and narrated a script which impressed the actor. On 1 May, Ajith's 52nd birthday, the production house officially announced Magizh as the director. The film's official title Vidaamuyarchi was revealed the same day. During the promotions of the film, Magizh stated that Ajith provided the source material of the story, making Vidaamuyarchi Magizh's first directorial based on another person's story.

=== Pre-production ===
Pre-production began in April 2023. During the process, the makers scouted for locations and chose either Abu Dhabi or Azerbaijan. However, due to unavoidable circumstances, they choose the latter location. According to Magizh, the film was initially planned to be a quick-project, with filming being held from October 2023 and being completed by January 2024, and it being released either in April or on 1 May 2024, coinciding with Ajith's 53rd birthday.

In mid-February 2023, Nirav Shah was announced as the cinematographer, in his first film with Magizh and fifth with Ajith after Billa (2007), Nerkonda Paarvai (2019), Valimai (2022) and Thunivu (2023). However, due to personal reasons, he opted out during the film's shoot and was replaced with Om Prakash. Anirudh Ravichander would score the music, in his first film with the director, whilst Magizh's norm editor N. B. Srikanth was retained.

=== Casting ===
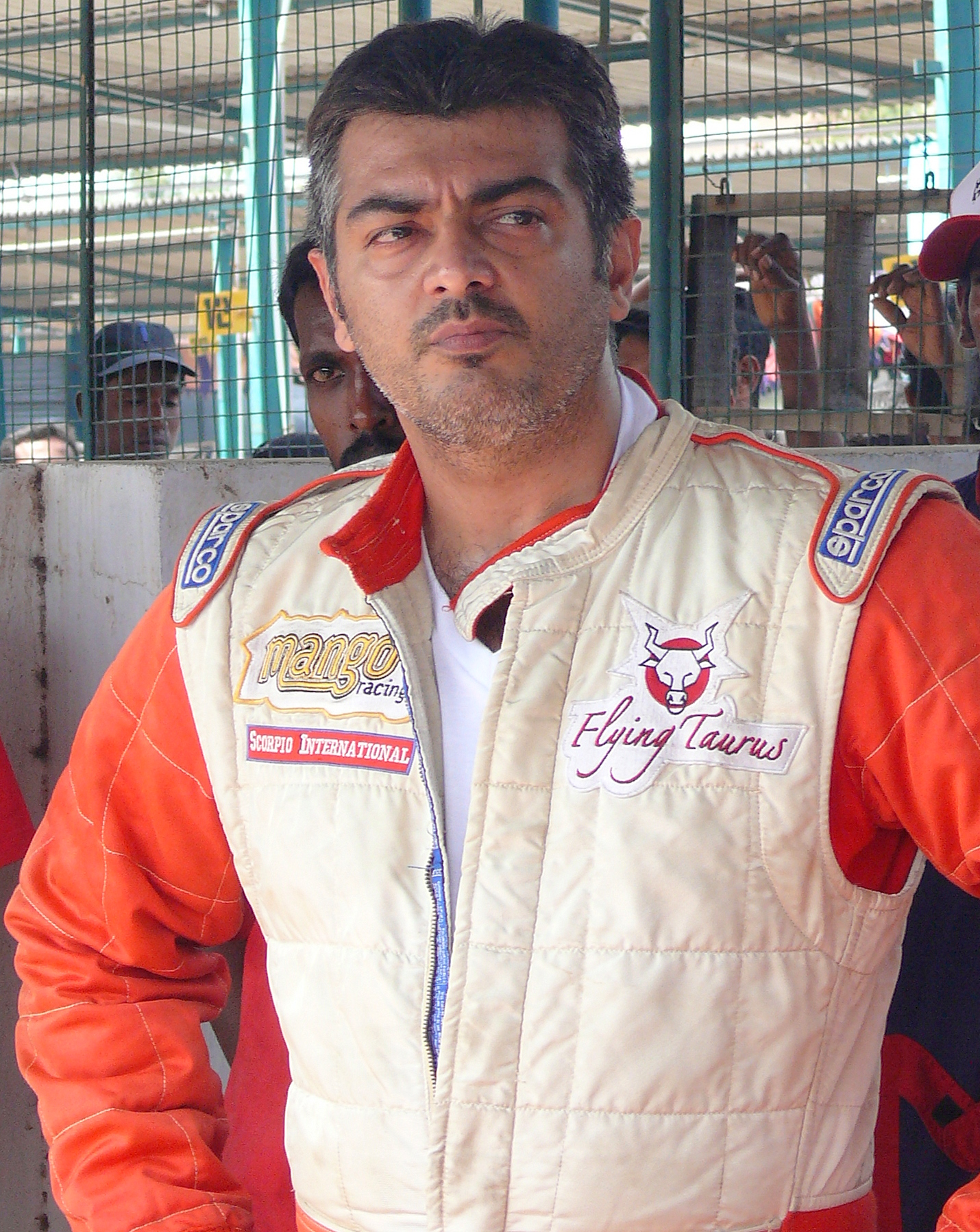
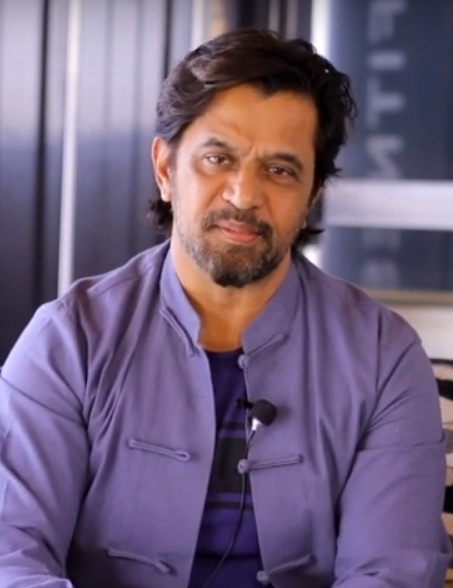
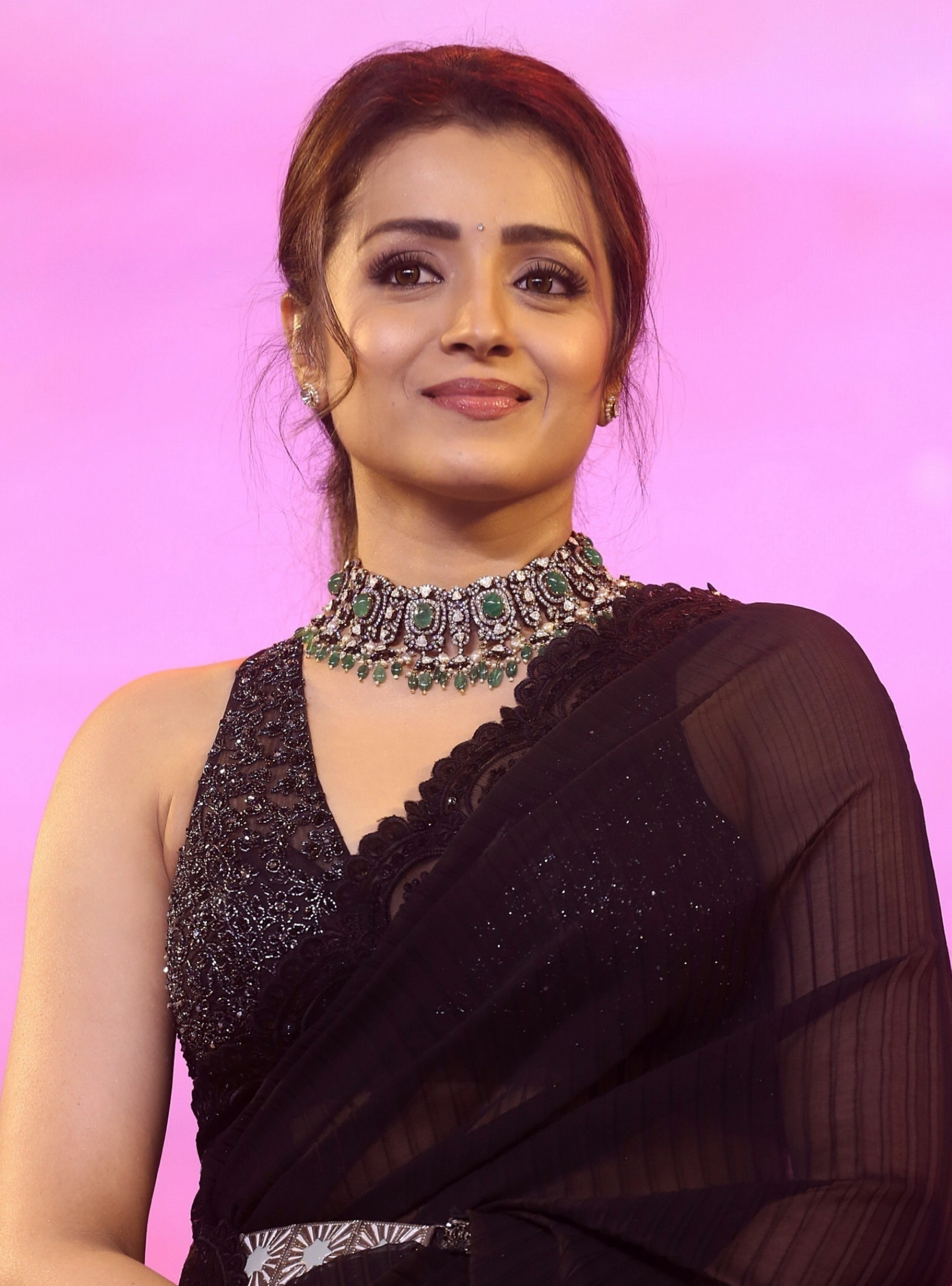
Vidaamuyarchi marks the second joint collaboration between Ajith Kumar (left), Arjun (middle), and Trisha (right) after Mankatha (2011).

In addition to his usual salt-and-pepper look, Ajith would sport a full-black hairstyle for his character in flashback portions, with certain scenes shot after his weight loss regime due to his involvement in the 24H Series. Sanjay Dutt was initially reported to play the main antagonist in his second Tamil film after Leo (2023). However, Arjun was instead confirmed, marking his reunion with Ajith after Mankatha (2011). Arjun Das was initially reported to be considered for the secondary antagonist, but as he was allegedly unable to allocate dates for the film, he was reportedly replaced by Arav, who previously collaborated with Magizh on Kalaga Thalaivan (2022). Arun Vijay was reported to play an important role in the film but declined due to his busy schedule.

Tamannaah Bhatia was initially reported to play the female lead; however, Trisha, who would pair opposite Ajith for the fifth time following Ji (2005), Kireedam (2007), Mankatha and Yennai Arindhaal (2015), was instead announced. Huma Qureshi, who earlier acted with Ajith in Valimai (2022), was reportedly considered for an important role. However, Regena Cassandrra was eventually cast in that role. In July 2024, Azerbaijani media reported that several local actors were a part of the film including Vidadi Hasanov and Javanshir Hadiyev. In August 2024, the production house announced the involvement of actors Nikhil Nair, Ganesh Saravanan and Dasarathi in prominent roles. Later, that December, Ramya Subramanian confirmed her presence in the film.

=== Filming ===
Principal photography began with the first schedule on 4 October 2023 in Azerbaijan. Initially, filming was intended to begin in the first week of September 2023 but was delayed due to Ajith's commitments to his world tour. The makers' decision to shoot in Azerbaijan received negative responses from netizens because of reports regarding the Nagorno-Karabakh conflict (2023 Azerbaijani offensive in Nagorno-Karabakh). However, according to trade analyst Ramesh Bala, the conflict was already over, and the makers were filming in Baku, far from the Nagorno-Karabakh region where the conflict happened. Furthermore, it was also reported that the production would be put on hold due to the ongoing Gaza war, but despite such reports, production continued. Art director Milan died during the film's preliminary shooting due to a heart attack. Later that month Ajith urged to set up a medical camp in case of any similar emergencies. In early November, it was reported that the schedule had been completed.

A sequence reportedly featured Ajith in a racy car action sequence, for which he did not use a stunt double. In early December, the team returned to Chennai due to the ongoing war and border issues in Azerbaijan, but later went back to Azerbaijan on 11 December to resume the production. Nirav Shah was replaced with Om Prakash due to the former not being able to allocate dates to travel to Azerbaijan. Arjun joined the film's sets in mid-December. Trisha completed filming her portions for the film schedule by 19 December, returning to Chennai on that day. The schedule concluded by 29 January 2024 with over 60 percent of the production being completed. The concurrent schedule was set to be held in London by February, but was delayed due to budget overruns and plans to complete 40 percent of the film's shooting within a single schedule were initiated for cost control.

Production was expected to resume in the last week of May, but was delayed as Ajith had started filming for Adhik Ravichandran's Good Bad Ugly (2025) in Hyderabad. The team along with Ajith returned to Azerbaijan on 20 June for the final schedule. This schedule was held around 35–45 days, with the climax portions being shot in Baku. Ajith, along with Trisha and Arjun, joined the concurrent schedule for some important sequences. According to the head of Lyca Productions, GKM Tamil Kumaran, principal photography was scheduled to be wrapped by mid-August. However, as of September 2024, it was only expected to be complete after Ajith finished shooting the October schedule for Good Bad Ugly. In December 2024, the team left to Bangkok for filming the final schedule, which would be held for ten days. Principal photography wrapped on 22 December 2024. Scenes featuring Azerbaijani actors were shot in Azerbaijani.

=== Post-production ===
The production house on 28 October 2024 announced that the film has entered the dubbing stage. On 7 December 2024, Ajith completed dubbing for his portions in Baku.

== Music ==
The soundtrack is composed by Anirudh Ravichander, in his first collaboration with Magizh; third with Ajith after Vedalam (2015) and Vivegam (2017). The audio rights were acquired by Sony Music India. The first single, "Sawadeeka" released on 27 December 2024. The second single "Pathikichu" was released on 19 January 2025. The third single "Thaniye" was released on 5 February 2025. The full album was released on 17 February 2025.

== Marketing ==
The first look poster of Vidaamuyarchi was released on 30 June 2024, and was poorly received by fans for its minimalist details. The second look poster, released a week later, was better received and seen as an improvement.

== Release ==
=== Theatrical ===
Vidaamuyarchi was initially scheduled to be released in January 2025, during Pongal, but was postponed due to undisclosed reasons. It was released theatrically on 6 February. having received a U/A certificate from the Central Board of Film Certification after some expletives were muted, with a runtime of 150 minutes and 46 seconds.

=== Distribution ===
Red Giant Movies acquired the distribution rights of the film for Tamil Nadu, Sree Gokulam Movies for Kerala, Swagath Enterprises for Karnataka, Asian Suresh Entertainment LLP for Andhra Pradesh and Telangana, and Sri Lakshmi Movies for Ceded Area.

=== Home media ===
The post-theatrical streaming rights were acquired by Netflix for ₹100 crore. The film began streaming there from 3 March 2025.

== Reception ==
=== Critical response ===
Vidaamuyarchi received mixed reviews from critics, who praised the lead cast's performance, visuals and action sequences, while the storyline and narration received criticism.

Ankit Oljha of The National News gave 4/5 stars and wrote that the "overall winner" was the director, "who helms a glossy big-budget thrill-a-minute joyride, and gives everything a chance to shine, from its lead star's screen presence and the gritty action sequences to the excellent character work and focused storytelling." Avinash Ramachandran of The Indian Express gave 3.5/5 stars and wrote "While the film is heavily revolving around Ajith, and he does a commendable job of dealing with anguish and perseverance [...] Vidaamuyarchi, existing in this form, is a fascinating addition to the evolving standards of superstar films in Tamil cinema."

Sudhir Srinivasan of Cinema Express gave 3.5/5 stars and wrote "Vidaamuyarchi is not a film about a hero who smashes his enemies into dust. It is a film about a man and a woman who refuse to turn on each other." Janani K of India Today gave 3/5 stars and wrote "Vidaamuyarchi lacked an emotional arc and some solid twists and turns. While it remained true to the film's genre, it could have had more gravitas." Kirubhakar Purushothaman of News18 gave 3/5 stars and wrote "Vidaamuyarchi is largely engaging throughout despite the predictability, and the credit goes to Magizh Thirumeni, who is exceptional in his smooth expositions."

Anusha Sundar of OTTPlay gave 3/5 stars and wrote "With gripping action sequences, a well-structured screenplay, and an understanding of story sense, Vidaamuyarchi is not your typical star-driven film." Sridevi S of The Times of India gave 2.5/5 stars and wrote "Vidaamuyarchi might find its space with some niche audience, but a racy screenplay, especially considering the genre, could have made the movie dearer to all." Gopinath Rajendran of The Hindu wrote "It's in the execution of ideas that Vidaamuyarchi falters the most. The basic plot is painfully simple and predictable, and the makers' attempts to add tension fall flat as we see a fair share of twists coming a mile away." Latha Srinivasan of Hindustan Times appreciated the cinematography but criticised the music, action sequences and felt the editing could have been "tighter".

=== Box office ===
Despite having high expectations among fans and general audiences, Vidaamuyarchi recorded the lowest opening day gross for an Ajith-starrer since the COVID-19 pandemic, according to The Times of India, which reported that the film opened to ₹22 crore (US$2.4 million) worldwide on its first day. The Indian Express reported that it grossed over ₹61 crore (US$6.5 million) worldwide in the first two days. Vidaamuyarchi wrapped its global theatrical run at ₹135.65–138 crore gross.

== Controversies ==
In April 2024, Ajith's manager Suresh Chandra released a video from the Azerbaijan schedule in November 2023, where Ajith and Arav faced a major accident, when a car driven by the former lost control as he intended to make a side stop. While Suresh insisted on the video being released months later, was to dismiss rumours of the film being shelved, it was met with backlash from fans who felt it was an attempt to seek sympathy.

A few days after the teaser's release, Paramount Pictures reportedly filed a notice against the film's makers, alleging that the film shared similarities with their 1997 release Breakdown and sought damages of ₹150 crore (US$16 million) for intellectual property infringement. However, Chitra Lakshmanan, who was in contact with the makers of Vidaamuyarchi, claimed they had brought the remake rights three months prior upon noticing the similarities between both films.

The film's postponement from January 2025 was met with criticism from fans of Ajith towards the production house as Good Bad Ugly was already pushed back from its January release window to accommodate Vidaamuyarchi, and this film's postponement left no Ajith release in January. Suresh Kamatchi, co-producer of the Pongal release Vanangaan, also criticised the producers for their sudden, uninformed decision as he felt it affected Pongal, an ideally lucrative box office season, making it less competitive and potentially minimising audience expectations.
