= List of Azerbaijani films of the 1920s =

A list of films produced in Azerbaijan SSR ordered by year of release in the 1920s:

Films:1918–1990 see also List of Soviet films

== 1923- ==
Title	Director	Cast	Genre	Notes
1923
IX Beynəlxalq Gənclər Gününün Bərpa edilməsi				
Azərbaycanda Çəyirtgə ilə Mübarizə				
Azərbaycanda İpəkçilik Sənayesi				
Azərbaycanda Suvarmanın və Pambıqçılığın Bərpa edilməsi				
Dağıstanda "Oktyabr İnqilabı" Kanalı				
Hərbi Dənizçilərin Həyatı				
M. İ. Kalininin Bakıya Səfəri				
Sovet Azərbaycanının III İldönümü				
Suraxanı Neft Mədənlərində Yanğın				
1924
Azərbaycana Səyahət	Abbas Mirza Sharifzadeh			(Sənədli Film)
Bakıda Tramvay Yolunun Salınması və Yolun Açılışı				
Bayquş				
Culfa-Bakı Yolu				
Fəhlə Məişəti				
Xalq Torpaq Komissarlığı				
Xəzər Gəmiçiliyi				
Mədənçi-Neftçi İstirahətdə və Müalicədə				
Qız Qalası				
Trotskinin Bakıya Səfəri				
1925
1 May 1925-ci İl				
1925-ci İldə Bakı Neftçilərinin İstirahəti				
Almaniya Fəhlə Nümayəndə Heyətinin Bakıya Səfəri				
Atəşpərəstlər Məbədi				
Azərbaycan Balığı				
Azərbaycan Həmkarlar İttifaqı Şurasının V İldönümü				
Azərbaycan Mədən Fəhlələri Həmkarlar İttifaqının IX Qurultayı				
Bakı SSRİ-nin İncisidir				
Bakıda M. V. Frunze Tərəfindən Qırmızı Ordu Hissələrinin Yoxlanılması				
Bibiheybətdə Qaz Fontanı Yanğını				
Bismillah	Abbas Mirza Sharifzadeh			
Dördüncü Bakı Yarmarkası				
Əvəz-Əvəzə				
Funtikovun Mühakiməsi				
İngiltərə Parlamenti Nümayəndə Heyəti Bakıda				
Nəriman Nərimanovun Dəfni				
Rəhbərlərin Bakıya Səfəri				
Sergey Yeseninin Bakıya Səfəri				
Suraxanıda Qaz Fontanı				
Şaxsey-Vaxsey				
1926
Azərbaycanda Kənd Təsərrüfatı				
Belçika Fəhlə Nümayəndə Heyəti Bakıda				
Birinci Türkoloji Qurultay				
Həyat Uğrunda Mübarizə				
Müxtəlif Sahillərdə				
1927
Azərbaycan Sovetlərinin V Qurultayı				
Balıqçılar				
B. S. Troyanovskinin Qastrolları				
Mədənçilər İttifaqının 20 İlliyi				
Oktyabrın On İlliyi				
1928
Azərbaycanda Kinopavilyonun Açılışı				
Bakı Soveti				
Balıqçılıq Sənayesi				
Bizim Əsas Yolumuz				
Əleyhqazla Müdafiə				
Gilan Qızı				
İpəkçilik				
Küləklər Şəhəri				
Qırmızı Ordunun Onilliyi				
Maksim Qorki Bakıda				
Pambıqçılıq				
Tütünçülük				
Üç Dəniz Ölkəsinin Spartakiadası				
Üzümçülük və Şərabçılıq				
1929
Sevil				
Hacı Qara	Abbas Mirza Sharifzadeh			
Xiffət				
Kommunist Əməyi Qalib Gəlir				
Mürsəlli Daşqını				
Neft Fontanı				
Vulkan Üzərində Ev				
Yaz Səpini				
