= List of Azerbaijani films of the 2000s =

A list of the most recent films produced in Azerbaijan ordered by year of release in the 2000s (decade):

== 2000s ==
Title	Director	Cast	Genre	Notes
2000
Etimad Telefonu				
2001
Yuxu (The Dream)				
2002
Haji Kara				
Wishing for Seven Sons and One Daughter			Short Documentary	
2003
Ovsunchu				
2004
Mekanin Melodiyasi				English title: Melody of Space
National Bomb				Entered into the 26th Moscow International Film Festival
2005
Arkhada Galmish Gelecek				
2006
The Lier				
2007
Mehkumlar				
2008
Javad Khan				in production
2009
Qarabagdir Azerbaycan by Cinealliance				
The 40th Door	Elcin Musaoglu		Drama	
