= Timur Odushev =

Azerbaijani ballet dancer and actor

- Born: January 16, 1993 (age 32); Baku, Azerbaijan
- Occupation: Actor
- Years active: 2010–present

Timur Odushev (born 16 January 1993) is an Azerbaijani actor, 32nd Young Artist Awards winner (2011).

For his performance in an International Feature Film, Timur Odushev won the award of Young Artist Awards 2011.

== Filmography ==
- The Precinct 2010
