= Rufat Hasanov =

Azerbaijani film director and producer

- Rüfət Həsənov
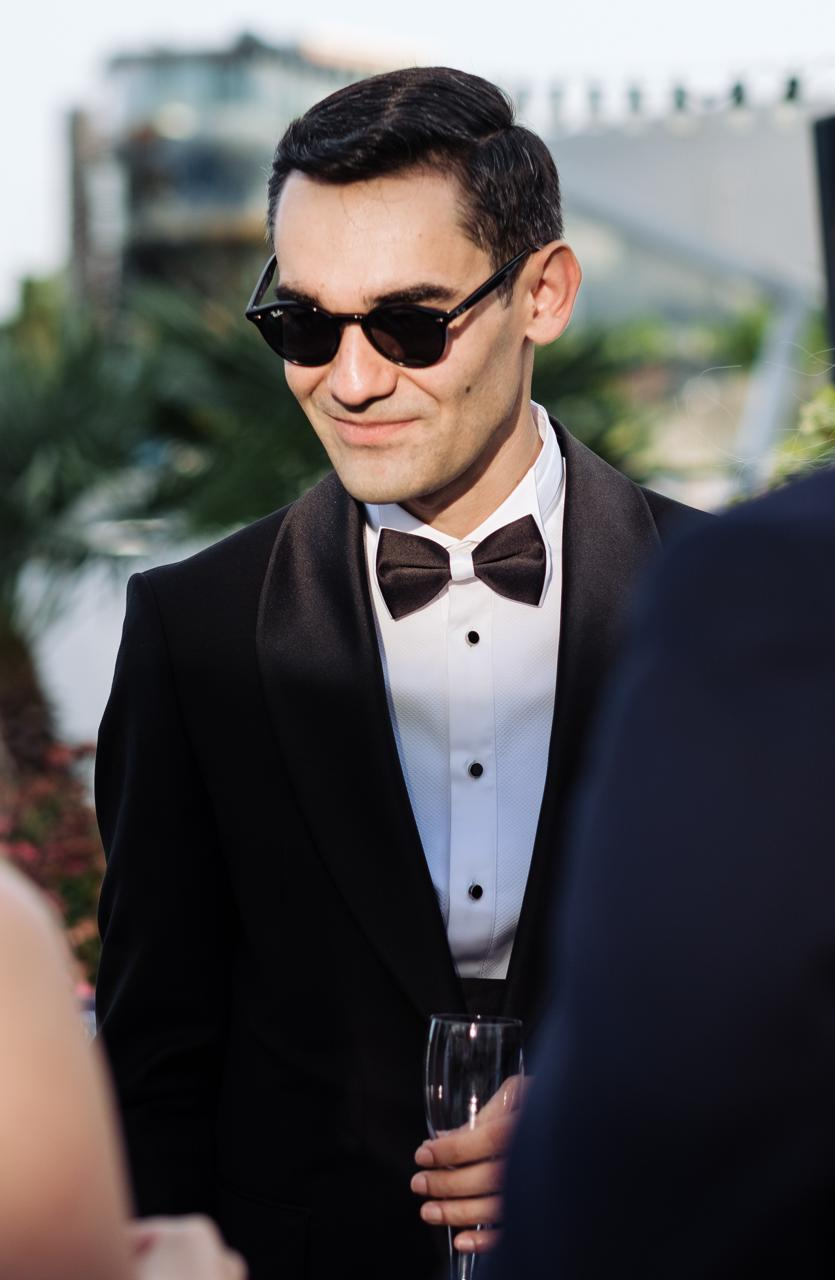
- Hasanov at the Sarajevo Film Festival in 2019
- Born: April 24, 1987 (age 39); Baku, Azerbaijan SSR, USSR
- Other name: Ru Hasanov
- Education: Bates College
- Occupations: Director, producer, film editor
- Notable work: The Island Within
- Awards: Best Director, Sarajevo Film Festival

Rufat "Ru" Hasanov (Azerbaijani: Rüfət Həsənov; born 24 April 1987) is an Azerbaijani film director, producer, editor, and a voting member of the European Film Academy.

== Early life and education ==
Born in Azerbaijan, Hasanov completed his secondary education at Quakertown Senior High School in Pennsylvania, graduating in 2003. He earned a B.A. in theatre with a minor in Russian Studies from Bates College in Maine (2005–2009). While at Bates, he took part in Black Factory, a landmark community performance project by William Pope.L. Hasanov went on to receive a Master of Fine Arts in Directing for Film & TV from the Higher Courses for Scriptwriters and Film Directors (HCFDS) in Moscow, graduating in 2012.

== Career ==
After Bates, Hasanov joined Vice Media (then VBS.tv) in New York in 2009, working across editorial and production. In 2010 he moved to Moscow and directed promotional and interstitial content at TV Rain. Later in life, Hasanov attended Berlinale Talents and the EAVE (European Audiovisual Entrepreneurs) Producers Workshop before first attracting international attention with his debut feature Chameleon (2013) which earned a Golden Leopard nomination at the Locarno Film Festival.

He went on to edit high-profile projects—collaborating with directors such as Bakur Bakuradze, Natalya Merkulova and Alexey Chupov. His second feature, The Island Within (2020), won Best Director at the Sarajevo Film Festival, received the International Jury Prize at Festival Nouvelles Images Persanes (Vitré), and was Azerbaijan's submission for Best International Feature Film at the 94th Academy Awards.

Starting in 2014, he has worked as a director at the Azerbaijanfilm studio. In 2019 he became CEO of Debut Film Studios, where he launched InterAct, a film laboratory supporting production, post-production, distribution, and funding for emerging filmmakers. In 2020 Hasanov joined the Ministry of Culture of Azerbaijan as Head of the Cinema Department (later Audiovisual & Interactive Media), overseeing the establishment of ARCA and serving as interim CEO from 2022 to 2023, as well as founding Filming Azerbaijan, the country's first national film commission.

Since 2023, Hasanov has been engaged with the innovative Screenlife format at Bazelevs Company, the Hollywood studio founded by Timur Bekmambetov. In 2025 he was selected as a Fellow at the Central Asia–Caucasus Institute in Washington, D.C.

=== Teaching and training ===
Hasanov has taught filmmaking since 2008, beginning as a visiting instructor at Rangeley Lakes Regional School in Maine, leading workshops at Summer Media Studio in Lithuania (2015), and serving on the faculty of the Azerbaijan State University of Culture and Arts and YARAT Contemporary Art Space in Baku.

Filmography

Year	Title	Director	Writer	Producer	Editor	Notes
2009	Force Majeure	Yes	Yes	Yes	Yes	Short
2010	O, Sortie!	Yes	Yes	No	Yes	Documentary
2012	012	Yes	Yes	No	Yes	Documentary
2013	Chameleon	Yes	Yes	No	Yes	
2014	My Grief is Light	Yes	Yes	No	Yes	Short
2017	No Such Thing	Yes	Yes	Yes	Yes	
2020	The Island Within	Yes	Yes	Yes	Yes	
2025	Thomas Goltz: An Oil Odyssey	Yes	Yes	Yes	Yes	Documentary
TBA	Small in Japan	Yes	Yes	No	Yes	

As producer

- Small in Japan (TBA)
- Thomas Goltz: An Oil Odyssey (2025)
- Two Days (2023) (uncredited)
- Orizuru (2022)
- Gokhuroba (2020) (uncredited)
- The Island Within (2020)
- No Such Thing (2017)
- Shanghai, Baku (2016)
- My Grief Is Light (2014)
- Chameleon (2013)
- 012 (2012)
- O, Sortie! (2010)
- Force Majeure (2009)

As editor

- Dative Case Problem (2026) (post-production)
- Red Color of the Second Planet (2024) (uncredited)
- Heartbreath (2021) (uncredited)
- Salt, Pepper to Taste (2019)
- It Means Love (2018)
- Sea of Tranquility (2017)
- The Trial: The State of Russia vs Oleg Sentsov (2017)
- A Lullaby for Yuki (2016)
- Sisters (2016)
- Shanghai, Baku (2016)
- Fedor’s Journey Through Moscow at the Turn of the 21st-century (2015)
- Rodchenko’s Stairs (2015)
- Brother Dejan (2015)
- Anthill (2015)
- The Wound (2014)
- Tekbetek (2014)
- Defocusin (2013)
- Intimate Parts (2013)
- Marina’s House (2012)

== Awards and recognition ==
=== Awards ===
- Best Director, Sarajevo Film Festival (The Island Within, 2020)
- International Jury Prize, Festival Nouvelles Images Persanes, Vitré (The Island Within, 2020)
- VGIK Summer Film Festival (O, Sortie!, 2010)

=== Official submissions ===
- Azerbaijan's entry for Best International Feature Film, 94th Academy Awards (The Island Within, 2020)

=== Nominations & festival selections ===
Chameleon (2013)

- Golden Leopard nomination, Filmmakers of the Present competition, Locarno Film Festival (Switzerland)
- Competition selection, Kinoshock International Film Festival (Russia)
- Competition selection, Eurasia International Film Festival (Kazakhstan)
- “Cinema Without Borders” selection, Molodist Kyiv International Film Festival (Ukraine)
- Competition selection, Pune International Film Festival (India)
- Competition selection, Malatya International Film Festival (Turkey)
- Competition selection, Tbilisi International Film Festival (Georgia)
- Debut competition selection, Spirit of Fire International Debut Film Festival (Russia)

The Island Within (2020)

- Main Competition selection, Sarajevo Film Festival (Bosnia and Herzegovina)
- International Jury Prize winner, Festival Nouvelles Images Persanes, Vitré (France)
- Official selection, Black Movie – Geneva International Independent Film Festival (Switzerland)
- Competition selection, Bosphorus International Film Festival (Turkey)
- Official selection, Moscow Premiere International Film Festival (Russia)
- Competition selection, Palić European Film Festival (Serbia)
- Competition selection, Bridges – East of the West Film Days (Belgium)
