= List of Azerbaijani films of the 1960s =

A list of earliest films produced in Azerbaijan SSR ordered by year of release in the 1960s:

Films:1918–1990 see also List of Soviet films

== 1960 ==
Title	Director	Cast	Genre	Notes
1960
Ağıllı Köməkçilər				
Akif Cəfərovun Briqadası				
Atom İnsana Xidmət edir				
Aygün	Kamil Rüstəmbəyov			TV
Azərbaycan Kino Sənəti				TV film
Azərbaycanın Suvarma Sistemində				
Bizim Opera				
Doğma Torpaq, Azərbaycan				
Elektrik Enerjisinə Qənaət edin				
Əyri Yolla Qazanc				
Hava Hücumundan Müdafiə				
İlk Müjdələr				
Koroğlu				
Qəribə Əhvalat				
Quyunun Yeraltı Təmiri Zamanı Təhlükəsizlik Texnikası				
Matteo Falkone				
Mənim Azərbaycanım				
Molla İbrahimxəlil Kimyagər				
Mollanın Sərgüzəşti				
N. S. Xruşşov Bakıda				
Neft və Qaz Quyularında Yanğının Söndürülməsi				
Odla Təkbətək Döyüş				
Pambığın Suvarılması Texnikası				
Pambıq Tarlalarının Mexanizatorları				
Səhər				
Sonuncu Müsahibə				
Süd Kombinatında				
Şanlı, Qeyri-Adi İl				
Şəbeh				TV
Yeddiilliyin Adamları və İlləri				
Yolda Əhvalat				

== 1961- ==
Title	Director	Cast	Genre	Notes
1961
Afrika Görüşləri				
Azərbaycanın Böyük Kimyası				
Azərbaycanın Kurortlarında				
Azərbaycanın Təsviri Sənəti				
Bakı Hava Hücumundan Müdafiə Dairəsində Spartakiada				
Balıqçılar				
Bizim Gülbala				
Bizim Küçə				
Bizim Mayaklar				
Bol Məhsulun Təminatı				
Boru Prokatı Zavodunda Əməyin Təhlükəsizliyi Uğrunda				
Çobanlar (film)				
Əminə Dilbazinin Rəqsləri				
Hacı Qara				
Həyat Öyrədir				
Xəzərdə Möcüzə				
Konsert				
Korun Mahnısı				
Leyli və Məcnun				
Leytenant Şmidt Adına Zavodda Əməyin Təhlükəsizliyi				
Mən Xəzər Dənizçisiyəm				
Pambığın Mexanikləşdirilmiş Yığımı				
Sən Bunu Bilməlisən				
Şöhrət vəya Unudulan Adam				TV film
1962
Bahar Rəqsləri				
Bizim Aşıqlar				
Böyük Dayaq				
Bu, Qum Adasında Olmuşdur				
Dağlarda Zavod				
Danabaş Kəndinin Əhvalatları				
Əmək və Qızılgül				
Gedən Dənizdən də Keçib Gedər				
Xəzər Sahilində Şəhər				
Körpə				
M. F. Axundov				
Mahnı Axşamı				
Möhtəşəm Tikintinin Adamları				
Müsyö Jordan				
Neft Sənayesində Ştanqsız Nasoslar				
Paltar Fabriki				
Payız Konserti				
Respublikanın Panoramı				
Sabir (film)				
Sərhəd Bağlıdır				
Telefonçu Qız				
Tofiq Əhmədovun Orkestrinin Konserti				
1963
Axırıncı Namaz				
Azərbaycanın Subtropiklərində				
Bacarıqlı Əllər				
Bayramın Birinci Günü				
Əhməd Haradadır?				
Ən Birinci				
Gecə Balıqçıları				
Xalq Nəğməkarı				
Xəzər Üzərindən Körpü				
Xəzər Üzərindən Körpü				
İşıq və Güc				
İyirmi İldən Sonra				
Kür				
Laçın Yuvası				
Marallarım				
Mənim Dostum				
Möcüzələr Adası				
Neft Boy Maddəsi				
"Nina" Mətbəəsi				
Poçt Qutusu				
Romeo Mənim Qonşumdur				
Sənin Təcümeyi-Halın				
Şən Əhvalatlar				
Yollar və Küçələrlə				
1964
Abidələr Danışır				
Arzu Yolu ilə				
Cazibə Qüvvəsi				
Dağ Meşəsindən Keçərkən				
Dağıstan Konserti				
Dənizdən Keçən Alov				
Dostluq Yolu ilə				
Əsrlər və İllər				
Güləş Qrosmeysteri				
Hacı Qara				
İçəri Şəhər				
Konsert Proqramı				
Kor Qadın				
Körpüsalanlar				
Qaradağ Balladası				
Meşədən Evə				
Mənim Qızılı Lənkəranım				
Muğan				
Neft-Qaz Mədənlərində Yanğının Söndürülməsi				
Reportaj Haqqında Reportaj				
Respublikamın Adamları				
Sabahın Xeyir, Bakı!				
Sehrli Xalat				
Səhər				
Sərdar İmrəliyev Məktəbi				
Sovet Azərbaycanının Nailiyyətləri				
Su Ərizəsi				
Sumqayıt Gənçlik Şəhəridir				
Şəhərimizin Uşaqları				
Şəhərin Ritmləri				
Ulduz				
Yeni Görüşlərədək, Müslüm				
Zəncirlənmiş Adam				
Zirvə				
1965
"Artek" in Bütün Qızılı				
"Gənclik" Məşəl Yandırır				
10 Dəqiqə Poeziya				
Arşın Mal Alan				
Azərbaycanın Səhnə Ustaları				
Bahar Gəlir				
Bakı Qalası				
Bakıya Xoş Gəlmisiniz				
Biz Arzu edənlər Nəslindənik				
Bizim Qadınlar				
Böyük Bostan				
Daha İki Nəfər				
Danışan İşıqlar				
Dağlar Oğlu				
Dostluq Melodiyaları				
Dostluq Məşəli				
Dəniz				
Dəniz Neftçilərinin Gündəlik İşləri				
Gəmilərin Təmiri Zamanı Texniki Təhlükəsizlik				
Konsert Proqramı				
Lenin Muğanda				
Mingəçevir				
Molbertlə Dünya Ölkələrinə Səyahət				
Muğamlar				
Qızıl Gül Olmayaydı				
Sağlamlıq Zonası				
Uzun Ömürlülər Diyarı				
Yenilməz Batalyon				
Yun Şal				
Yüksək Pambıq-Xammal Yetişdirilməsi				
Üzeyir Hacıbəyov				
Şirvanneft				
Şəhər Üzərində Mahnı				
Şəki				
Şəki Sarayı				
Əbədi Qardaşıq				
Ən Dərin				
1966
Shirali descended from the mountain				
1967
1968
1969
Shared bread				
