= Javanshir Hadiyev =

Azerbaijani film actor

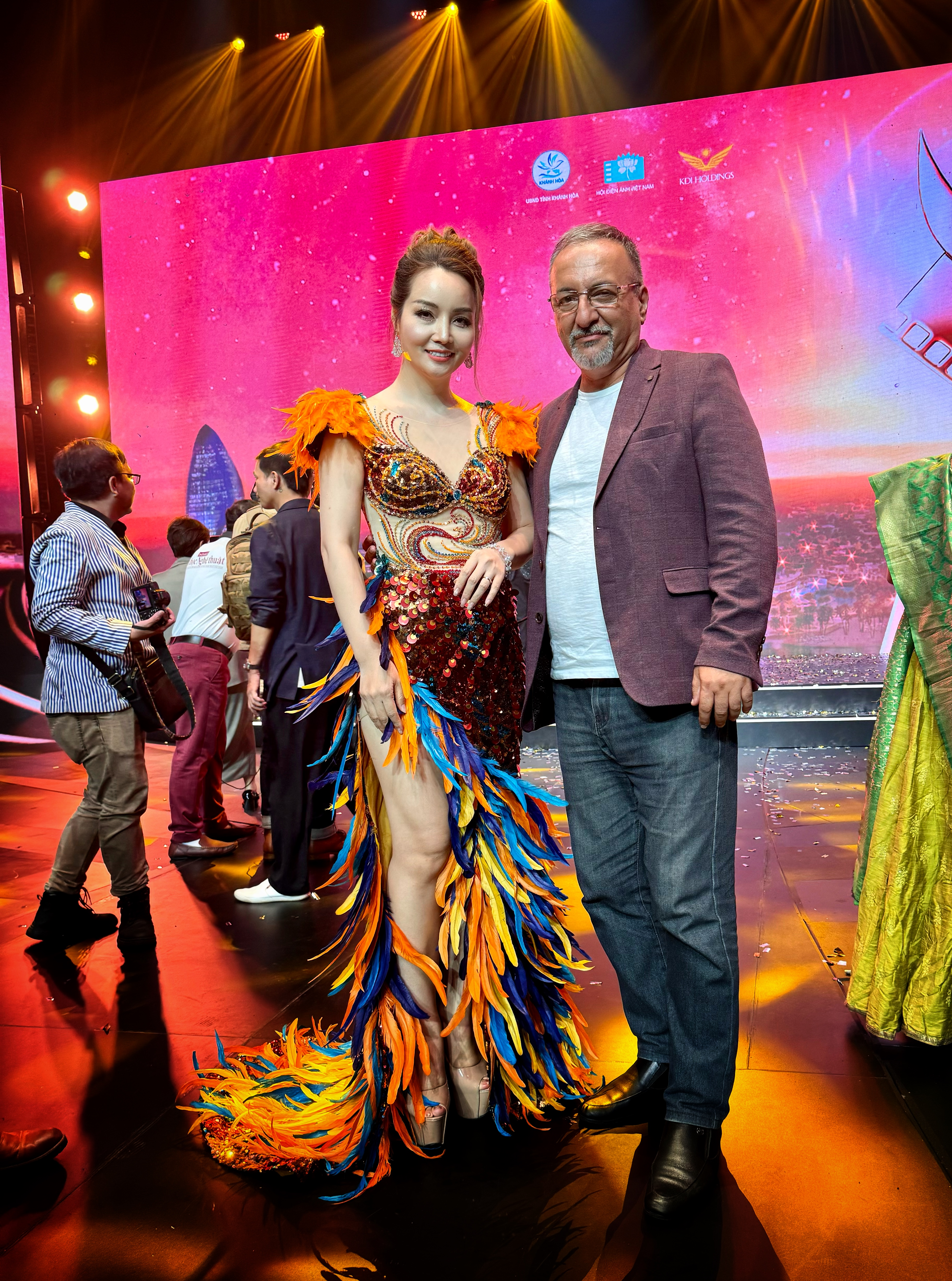
- Javanshir Hadiyev and Vietnamese actress Mai Thu Huyen at the "Golden Kite 2024" award ceremony of Vietnam
- Born: 18 April 1969 (age 57); Baku, Azerbaijan
- Education: Gerasimov Institute of Cinematography, USSR
- Occupation: Actor
- Years active: 1991–present
- Awards: Honored Artist of the Republic of Azerbaijan

Javanshir Hadiyev (born 18 April 1969) is an Azerbaijani film actor and Honored Artist of the Republic of Azerbaijan (2018).

== Life ==
Javanshir Hadiyev was born in 1969 in Baku. He received his secondary education at school number 126. In 1986, he was admitted to the All-Union State Institute of Cinematography in Moscow in the theater and film acting specialty class of the well-known Russian actor and director Aleksey Batalov. In 1990, he finished his studies and returned to Azerbaijan. After arriving in Baku, he started working at the Azerbaijan State Academic Russian Drama Theater, Azerbaijan State National Youth Theater and "Yug" theaters. Later, he left the theater and continued his work as a military director in the documentary film studio of the Ministry of Defense of Azerbaijan. In 2000, he was invited to "Lider" television as a dubbing director.

== Career ==
Javanshir Hadiyev has portrayed characters in nearly 30 films. He first appeared in 1991 in the short comedy An Ordinary Story in the 162nd edition of the Mozalan film journal. In 1993, he played a role in the film Faryad (Scream), which was released that year. In 2010, Elkhan Jafarov invited him to the film Dolu. Later, Turkish director Mehmet Ulukan invited him to his TV series Flower of Darkness. Javanshir Hadiyev appears in the TV series together with Azerbaijan People's Artist Rasim Balayev and Honored Artist Abbas Kahramanov. In 2012, he received an invitation from Egor Konchalovsky in the project Baku, I Love You and took part in one of the leading roles under the direction of Andrey Razenkov. In 2013, he appeared in the TV series Jackal's Breath, and in 2019, he played the lead role in an Indian film produced by Ahmed Ibrahim. In 2024, Hadiyev appeared in the action film Vidaamuyarchi ("Persistence"; 2025).

Javanshir Hadiyev is the head of "Georgia-Azerbaijan Cultural Relations Association".

In 2024, as part of a collaborative effort by the Vietnam Film Association to strengthen Vietnam-Azerbaijan film relations, representatives of the Azerbaijani film industry, including Honored Artist and actress Gülzar Qurbanova, and Honored Artist and actor Javanshir Hadiyev, made an official visit to the Socialist Republic of Vietnam. They attended the "Golden Kite 2024" awards ceremony organized by the Vietnam Film Association from 9 to 14 September.

== Awards ==
On 1 August 2018 he was awarded the honorary title of Honored Artist of Azerbaijan by the order of the President of the Republic of Azerbaijan "On awarding honorary titles to cinema figures of Azerbaijan".

== Filmography ==
- An Ordinary Story (Mozalan, 162nd edition) (short comedy, 1991)
- The Scream (film, 1993)
- Hail (film, 2012)
- Mystery (series, 2012)
- Flower of Darkness (TV series, 2011)
- Dervish Notes (film, 2013)
- Breath of the Jackal (film, 2013)
- Clay (film, 2013)
- Revenge (TV series, 2014)
- Baku, I Love You! (film, 2015)
- Bahram Gur (film, 2015)
- The Woman Next Door (film, 2015)
- Incomplete Memories (film, 2015)
- Dance of Good and Evil (film, 2015)
- The Last Road (film, 2016)
- Not Yours (film, 2016)
- Laurel Tree (TV series, 2016)
- Karabakh Letter (serial, 2016–2017)
- The Night Guest 2 (2017) (Feature)
- The Bureau (TV series, 2017, France)
- Blood Relatives (TV series, 2019)
- False Truth (TV series, 2021)
- Hidden Wound (TV series, 2023)
- No One In This City (TV series, 2024)
- Vidaamuyarchi (film, 2024, India)
