= Taghiyev: Oil =

- Theatrical release poster
- Directed by: Zaur Gasimli
- Written by: Ismayil Iman; Asif Iskenderli; Zaur Gasimli
- Produced by: Arzu Aliyeva, Orman Aliyev
- Starring: Parviz Mamedrzaev
- Cinematography: Vladimir Artemyev
- Edited by: Asgar Rahimov
- Music by: Etibar Asadli
- Production company: Baku Media Center
- Distributed by: Baku Media Center
- Release dates: November 4, 2024 (Heydar Aliyev Center); November 7, 2024 (Azerbaijan)
- Running time: 104 minutes
- Country: Azerbaijan
- Language: Azerbaijani

Taghiyev: Oil (Azerbaijani: Tağıyev: Neft) is a 2024 Azerbaijani historical biographical drama film co-written and directed by Zaur Gasimli. It follows the life and work of philanthropist Zeynalabdin Taghiyev, played by Parviz Mamedrzaev. The film is the first installment of Zeynalabdin Taghiyev's tetralogy, followed by Taghiyev: The Tsar (2025), Taghiyev: Sona (2025) and Taghiyev: School (2026).

It was selected as the Azerbaijani entry for the Best International Feature Film at the 98th Academy Awards, but it was not nominated.

== Cast ==
- Parviz Mamedrzaev as Zeynalabdin Taghiev
  - Qurban Ismayilov as Old Zeynalabdin Taghiev
- Perviz Memmedrzayev as Zeynalabdin
  - Gurban Ismailov as Old Zeynalabdin
- Nurlan Murselzade as Ismayil Taghiev
- Yusif Qasimli as Rajab Ali
- Natavan Haciyeva as Zeyneb
- Manaf Süleymanov as Abu-Ziyad
- Rasim Cafarov
- Elshan Rustamov

== Production ==
Principal photography lasted 136 days over 1 year in over 70 locations.

== Release ==
The film had its world premiere on November 4, 2024, at the Heydar Aliyev Center, followed by a wide national theatrical release on November 7.

== Box office ==
During its entire run in Azerbaijani billboard, the film attracted 70,000 viewers.

== See also ==
- List of submissions to the 98th Academy Awards for Best International Feature Film
- List of Azerbaijani submissions for the Academy Award for Best International Feature Film
