= Milan (art director) =

Indian film art director (died 2023)

Milan Fernendez
- Born: c. 1969
- Died: 15 October 2023 (aged 54); Azerbaijan
- Occupation: Art director
- Years active: 2005–2023

Milan Fernandez (c. 1969 – 15 October 2023), often cited simply as Milan, was an Indian film art director. He is best known in the Tamil film industry for his films such as Billa (2007), Velayutham (2011) and Vedalam (2015).

== Early life ==
Milan started his career as assistant to art director Sabu Cyril in 1999, and worked in films including Citizen, Thamizhan, Red, Villain and Anniyan.

== Career ==
Milan worked more than 30 films and 120 commercials such as Sakthi masala, Aachi masala, RMKV, Saravana Stores and Pothys.

== Death ==
Milan died from a heart attack on 15 October 2023, at the age of 54 in Azerbaijan, during production of Vidaamuyarchi.

== Filmography ==
Year	Film	Language	Notes
2007	Oram Po	Tamil	
2007	Billa	Tamil	
2008	Vaitheeswaran	Tamil	
2008	Aegan	Tamil	
2009	Solla Solla Inikkum	Tamil	
2009	Modhi Vilayadu	Tamil	
2009	Vettaikaaran	Tamil	
2010	Siddhu +2	Tamil	
2010	Chikku Bukku	Tamil	
2010	Jaggubhai	Tamil	
2011	My Dear Kuttichathan	Tamil	
2011	Velayutham	Tamil	
2012	Dhik Dhik	Tamil	
2012	Padmasree Bharat Dr. Saroj Kumar	Malayalam	
2013	Endrendrum Punnagai	Tamil	
2014	Veeram	Tamil	
2015	Isai	Tamil	
2015	Sigaram Thodu	Tamil	
2015	Romeo Juliet	Tamil	
2016	Saagasam	Tamil	
2015	Vedalam	Tamil	
2017	Oxygen	Telugu	
2017	Bogan	Tamil	
2017	Vivegam	Tamil	
2018	Johnny	Tamil	
2018	Saamy 2	Tamil	
2019	Viswasam	Tamil	
2022	Valimai	Tamil	
2023	Thunivu	Tamil	
2023	Pathu Thala	Tamil	
2024	Kanguva	Tamil	posthumous release
2025	Vidaamuyarchi	Tamil	final and posthumous release; film dedicated in his honour
