= Kazim Abdullayev =

Azerbaijani actor

Kazim Enver oglu Abdullayev
- Born: Kazim Enver oglu Abdullayev; April 6, 1953 (age 73); Baku
- Education: Drama and Film Acting faculty, Azerbaijan State Institute of Arts
- Occupation: Actor
- Years active: 1976–present
- Employers: Huseyn Arablinski Sumgait State Drama Theater (1976–1996); Baku Municipal Theater (1996–present)
- Awards: People's Artiste (2019)

Kazim Enver oglu Abdullayev (6 April 1953, Baku) is an Azerbaijani actor.

== Career ==
As soon as Kazim graduated from secondary school, at the age of 17, he entered the Drama and Film Acting faculty of the Azerbaijan State Institute of Arts. He was accepted into the class of Adil Isgandarov, who created his own school in the Azerbaijani theater and headed the Academic National Drama Theater for many years.

Kazim, who graduated in 1974, began his career as an actor at the Huseyn Arablinski Sumgait State Drama Theater in 1976. At the same time, he played Manaf in Jamal Yusifzadeh's play Səhər qatarı. Since Kazim Abdullayev lived in Baku and was tired of traveling from Baku to Sumgayit every day, he decided to join the Baku Municipal Theater in January 1996.

He eventually became a People's Artiste in 2019. His lack of earning the title earlier was criticized by certain media outlets who felt that he deserved the title.

== Personal life ==
Kazim lost both his brother and sister. He underwent heart surgery on 2 October 2019.

== Filmography ==
- Arxadan vurulan zərbə (1977)
- Dantenin yubileyi (1978)
- Arvadım mənim, uşaqlarım mənim (1978)
- Təkcə adanı özünlə apara bilməzsən... (1980)
- İlıq dənizdə buz parçası (1983)
- İşarəni dənizdən gözləyin (1986)
- Qaladan tapılan mücrü (1982)
- Qanlı zəmi (1985)
- Alman klinikasına şəxsi səfər (1988)
- Qəzəlxan (1991)
- Ağ dünya (1995)
- Həm ziyarət, həm ticarət... (1995)
- Yük (film, 1995)
- Ah, ədalət!
- Anamın kitabı (1994)
- Son döyüş (1996)
- Ləqəbi "İKA"dır (1997)
- Bəsdir, ağlama! (1999)
- Ayrılıq imiş (film, 2008)
- Azərbaycan xanlıqları. Naxçıvan və İrəvan xanlıqları (2003)
- Başmaq (2001)
- Bir anın həqiqəti (2003)
- Cavanşir ( 2002)
- Cavid ömrü (2007)
- "İldırım"lı yolun yolçuları (2003)
- Kitabi Dədə Qorqud. Səkrəyin dastanı (1990)
- Koramal (2009)
- Absurdistan (film) (2008)
- Qaydasız döyüş (2009)
- Qorxma, mən səninləyəm
- Milli bomba (2004)
- Oyun (2003)
- Seçilən (2008)
- Ünvansız qız (1999)
- Yanmış körpülər (2007)
- Yarımçıq qalmış dosye (2002)
- Dəfnə ağacı (series, 2016)- as Akbar
- Dəfnə ağacı (series, 2016)
- Həyat çiçəyi (series, 2013)
- Məryəm (2016)- as Vidadi
- Nar bağı (2017)
- Sevgi Romanı ( 2020)
- Son nəfəs (series, 2021)
- Vidaamuyarchi (film, 2024, India)- as Jabbar
