= The Island Within =

2020 film

- Theatrical release poster
- Directed by: Ru Hasanov
- Written by: Ru Hasanov
- Produced by: Guillaume de Seille; Ru Hasanov; Orkhan Tarverdizade
- Starring: Orkhan Ata
- Cinematography: Orkhan Abbasoff
- Edited by: Orkhan Abbasoff; Ru Hasanov
- Music by: Farhad Farzali; Katya Yonder
- Production companies: Coyote Cinema; Arizona Productions
- Release date: 17 August 2020 (Sarajevo FF)
- Running time: 79 minutes
- Country: Azerbaijan
- Language: Azerbaijani

The Island Within (Azerbaijani: Daxildəki Ada) is a 2020 Azerbaijani comedy-drama film written and directed by Ru Hasanov. Prize 2021 of the international jury at the Festival Nouvelles Images Persanes in Vitré (France), it was selected as the Azerbaijani entry for the Best International Feature Film at the 94th Academy Awards.

== Cast ==
- Orkhan Ata as Seymour Tahirbekov
- Vidadi Hasanov as Khanlar Tahirbekov
- Rafiq Azimov as Grandfather
- Elshan Jabrayilov as Minister of Sports

== See also ==
- List of submissions to the 94th Academy Awards for Best International Feature Film
- List of Azerbaijani submissions for the Academy Award for Best International Feature Film
