= List of Azerbaijani films of the 1950s =

A list of films produced in Azerbaijan SSR ordered by year of release in the 1950s:

Films:1918–1990 see also List of Soviet films

== 1950s ==
Title	Director	Cast	Genre	Notes
1950
Bakının İşıqları				
Əmanət Kassası				
Əməyə Eşq Olsun				
Gədəbəyin Sərvəti				
Kolxoz Tarlalarının Qəhrəmanları				
Mingəçevir				
Sağlamlığın Düşmənləri				
Sağlamlıq Mənbəyi				
Səhər Nəğməsi				
Sovet Azərbaycanı				
1951
Azərbaycan Zeytunu				
Azərbaycanın Müalicə Ocaqları				
Elmlə Dostluq Şəraitində				
Gənc Leninçilər				
Respublika Stadionu				
1952
Budyonnı Bakıda				
Güllər				
Heyvanları Xəstəlikdən Necə Qorumalı				
Heyvanların Damazlıq üçün Qiymətləndirilməsi və Seçilməsi				
Xəzər Neftçiləri				
Kolxoz Quş Fermaları				
Neft Kəşfiyyatçıları				
Payız Tumu Yüksək Məhsulun Əsasıdır				
Sovet Toxumçuları				
1953
Bitki Aləminin Rəngarəngliyi				
Bruselyoz				
Dəmyə Pambıq				
Ev Quşlarının Sayını Artıraq				
Əkin Bitkilərinin Qorunması				
Faraş Tərəvəz				
Göbələk Xəstəliyi				
Gözlərinizi Qoruyun				
Xərçəngin Əmələ gəlməsinə Xəbərdarlıq				
Xəzər Neftçiləri Haqqında Dastan				
Qabaqcıl Traktor Briqadasında				
Qanlı İshaldan Qorunun				
Quba Bağlarında				
Quduzluqla Mübarizə aparın				
Toxumun Hazırlanması				
Vərəm Sağala Bilən Xəstəlikdir				
Yemlərin Siloslaşdırılması				
1954
Balaca Uşaqların Bədənini Möhkəmləndirin				
Bərəkətli Torpaq				
Çoxillik Otlar				
Dəniz Nefti Axır				
Doğma Xalqıma				
Həyata Keçmiş Arzular				
İpəkçilik				
Qrip				
Mahnı Bayramı				
Özünü Qoru				
S. M. Kirov Adına Körfəzdə				
1955
Alagöz Yaylağında				
Azərbaycan Pambıqçılığında Qabaqcıl Aqrotexnikanın Tətbiq edilməsi				
Bəxtiyar				
Görüş				
Qabaqcıl Sovxozda				
Neft Ustaları				
1956
O Olmasin, Bu Olsun	Huseyn Seyidzadeh			
Gənc Metallurqlar				
Keçmişin Şahidləri				
Kitab-Poçtla'nın Xidmətlərindən İstifadə edin				
Qara Daşlar				
Səadət Yolu ilə				
Şamdan Bəy				
1957
Mahni Bele Yaranir				
Bəsləsən Atlas Olar Tut Yarpağından				
Bir Məhəllədən İki Nəfər				
Xalq Hədiyyəsi				
Qızmar Günəş Altında				
Səadət və Əmək Mahnıları				
1958
Ogey Ana	Habib Ismayilov	Najiba Malikova, Jeyhun Mirzayev	Drama	English title: Stepmother
"Ağ Qızıl" Ustaları				
Bakı Bu Gün				
Bizim Bakıda				
"Kazbek" Qutusu				
Kölgələr Sürünür				
Məhəmməd Füzuli				
Onun 150 Yaşı Var				
Onun Böyük Ürəyi				
Ögey Ana				
Səməd Vurğun (film)				
Təbiətin Dostları				
Uzaq Sahillərdə	Tofig Tagizade	Nodar Shashiqoglu, Alasgar Alakbarov	Drama	
Yeni İl Gecəsində				
1959
Esl Dost	Tofig Tagizade	Nodar Shashiqoglu, Mukhlis Jani-zade	Drama	
Azərbaycan Mədəniyyətinin Baharı				
Bir Qalanın Sirri				
Bizim Azərbaycan				
Bizim Kolxoz				
"Bolqarıstan" Kolxozu				
Dənizi Fəth edənlər				
DQMV				
Dostluq Dili				
Əsl Dost				
Xəzər Donanması				
Mahnı Qanadlarında				
Moskva Azərbaycan Ongünlüyü				
Müsibəti Fəxrəddin				
Naxçıvan MSSR				
Nizami				
Onu Bağışlamaq Olarmı?	Rza Tahmasib			
