= Qayğı =

- Location within Azerbaijan Location within East Zangezur Economic Region
- Coordinates: 39°33′59.0″N 46°34′47.2″E
- Country: Azerbaijan
- District: Lachin

Population
  - Total: 40
- Time zone: UTC+4 (AZT)
  - Summer (DST): UTC+5 (AZT)

Qayğı (Gayghy) is a town in the Lachin District of Azerbaijan.
