= List of Azerbaijani films of the 1930s =

A list of earliest films produced in Azerbaijan SSR ordered by year of release in the 1930s:

Films: 1918–1990 see also List of Soviet films

== 1930 ==
Title	Director	Cast	Genre	Notes
1930
Azneft'in Onilliyi				
Həmkarlar İttifaqının 10 İlliyi				
İliç Buxtasında Qaz Fontanı Yanğını və Qara Şəhərdə Neft Çənlərində Yanğın				
İlk Komsomol Buruğu				
Qızıl Kol				
Lətif				
Milisin Onilliyi				
Raport Veririk				
S. Orconikidze Adına Azərbaycan Diviziyasının Onilliyi				
Şərqə Doğru				
Tütünçülük				

== 1931- ==
Title	Director	Cast	Genre	Notes
1931
XI Çağırış Bakı Sovetinin I Plenumu				
Azerbaijan				
Bizim Əkinimiz				
Dənizdə Neft Yanğını				
Gözlərinizi Qoruyun				
Xalq Komissarı Qəzənfər Musabəyovun Nitqi				
İkinci Bolşevik Baharı				
Qaz				
Qurban Bayramı				
Neft Beşilliyinin Bolşevikləri				
Nikita İvanoviç və Sosializm				
Pambıq Koluna Qulluq edilməsi				
Taxıldöymə				
Uşaq Baxımsızlığı ilə Mübarizə				
Üzgüçülük				
Velosiped Yürüşü				
1932
İyirmi Altı Komissar				
Azərbaycan Diviziyasının Düşərgələrində				
Direktiv Bant				
Əlsiz Adamlar				
İyirmi Altı Komissar				
Komsomol Neft Cəbhəsində				
Neft Zərbəçiləri				
Silos Yemi				
1933
26 Bakı Komissarının Güllələndiyi Yerə Yürüş				
Cat				Cizgi Film
Köçərilər				
Lökbatan				
Milis				
Neft Simfoniyası				
Pambıq				
Traxoma				
1934
I Azərbaycan Spartakiadası				
Azərbaycan İncəsənəti				
Bakıda Oktyabrın 17-ci İldönümü				
Dostlar				
İki Yoldaş				
İnqilab Tribunu				
İsmət				
Quş Qoruğu				
Malyariya				
Proletar Bakısının Sovetlərini Möhkəmləndirək				
1935
Abbasın Bədbəxtliyi				
Altıncı Hiss				
Azərbaycan Günü				
Azərbaycan SSR-nin 15 İlliyi				
Cəfər Cabbarlının Dəfni				
Gil Məhlulu				
Mavi Dənizin Sahilində				
Məhəbbət Oyunu	Abbas Mirza Sharifzadeh			
Rəqs Edən Bağalar				
Sovet Subtropikləri				
Şöhrətli Azərbaycan				
1936
Almaz				
Bakı İşçi Teatrının 15 İlliyi				
Bakıda Staxanov Mayı				
Elektrometriya Vasitəsilə Axtarış				
Klim Voroşilov Bakıda				
Qazma İşlərində Təhlükəsizlik				
Türk Qadınının Baharı				
Yüksək Məhsul Uğrunda				
Yüksək Mükafat				
Zərbəçi Kolxozçuların I Toplanışı				
1937
Azərbaycan Atları				
Azərbaycan Xilaskarlarının Xatirəsinə				
Azərbaycan SSR Sovetlərinin VIII Fövqəladə Qurultayı				
Bədən Tərbiyəsi və İdman				
Bir Gün				
Dağlıq Qarabağda				
Dəcəl Dəstə				
Əhalinin Siyahıya Alınması				
Ərzaq Mağazası				
Gümüşü Qağayılar				
Hava Hücumundan Müdafiə				
Xalq Yaradıcılığı Festivalı				
Xəzər Dənizinin Dibi				
Xınalıqlıların Qonağı				
Kosinus F-4 : Enerjiyə Qənaət				
Qırmızı Ordu Ansamblı				
Mədəni Ticarət				
Motosiklet Yarışı				
Neft Keşikçiləri				
Pambıq Yığımı Staxanovçuları				
Pambıq Yığımı Staxanovçuları				
S. M. Kirova Abidə Özülünün Qoyulması				
SSRİ Ali Sovetinə Seçkilər Qarşısında				
Şuşa Kurort və İstirahət Mərkəzidir				
Yeni Həyata Doğru				
Zaqatalada				
1938
Azərbaycan Aşıqları				
Azərbaycan Kənd Təsərrüfatı Sərgisində				
Bakı Oktyabrı Bayram edir				
Bakılılar				
Fəxri Keşikdə				
İstedadlar Məktəbi				
Komsomol Nəsli				
Kürdüstanda				
Qanköçürmə				
Malyariya				
Ordenli Azərbaycan				
Pambıq				
Pionerlər				
Rəhbərin Vətənində				
Sovet Gimnastları				
Ümumxalq Təntənəsi				
Üzümçülük və Şərabçılıq				
Yaşasın Azərbaycan Artistləri				
Yeni Muzey				
1939
Artyom Adası				
Azərbaycan SSR Ali Sovetinin II Sessiyası				
Bakıda Beynəlxalq Gənclər Gününün 25 İlliyi				
Böyük Maarifçi-Yazıçı M. F. Axundov				
Əmək Bayramı-1 May				
Hazır Ol				
Kəndlilər				
SSRİ-də Neft				
Stalin Adına Samur-Dəvəçi Kanalı				
Şərqin Astanasında				
Vətənə And				
Yanğınsöndürmə Komandası				
