= Pomegranate Orchard =

2017 film

- Film poster
- Directed by: Ilgar Najaf
- Written by: Ilgar Najaf
- Screenplay by: Asif Rustamov, Ilgar Najaf, Roelof Yan
- Produced by: Mushfug Hatamov; Ilgar Najaf
- Starring: Hasan Agayev
- Cinematography: Aykhan Salar
- Edited by: Elmir Hasanov
- Music by: Firuddin Allahverdi
- Release date: 1 July 2017 (Karlovy Vary)
- Running time: 90 minutes
- Country: Azerbaijan
- Language: Azerbaijani

Pomegranate Orchard (Azerbaijani: Nar bağı) is a 2017 Azerbaijani drama film directed by Ilgar Najaf. It was selected as the Azerbaijani entry for the Best Foreign Language Film at the 90th Academy Awards, but it was not nominated.

== Plot ==
Inspired by Anton Chekhov's 1904 play The Cherry Orchard, the film follows a prodigal son who returns after 12 years. His reappearance at the family home in rural Azerbaijan significantly alters their way of life.

== Cast ==
- Hasan Agayev as Jalal
- Samimi Farhad as Gabil
- Ilaha Hasanova as Sara
- Gurban Ismailov as Shamil

== See also ==
- List of submissions to the 90th Academy Awards for Best Foreign Language Film
- List of Azerbaijani submissions for the Academy Award for Best Foreign Language Film
