= The Precinct (film) =

2010 film

- Film poster
- Directed by: Ilgar Safat
- Written by: Ilgar Safat
- Produced by: Nariman Mammadov
- Cinematography: Mindia Esadze; Varlam Karchkhadze
- Edited by: Levan Kukhashvili; Ilgar Safat
- Music by: Andrey Doynikov
- Release dates: 23 September 2010 (Azerbaijan); 3 December 2010 (United States)
- Running time: 116 minutes
- Country: Azerbaijan
- Languages: Azerbaijani; Russian

The Precinct (Azerbaijani: Sahə) is a 2010 Azerbaijani drama film directed by Ilgar Safat. The film was selected as the Azerbaijani entry for the Best Foreign Language Film at the 83rd Academy Awards, but it did not make the final shortlist.

== Cast ==
- Zaza Bejashvili as Garib
- Teymur Odushev as young Garib
- Melissa Papel as Sabina
- Vagif Ibrahimoglu as Police chief
- Nina Rakova as Alina
- Ramis Ibrahimov
- Mammad Safa
- Farid Bagirov

== Plot ==
A photographer receives an assignment to Africa which conflicts with his upcoming wedding. After a near-death experience, he grapples with suppressed guilt in the otherworldly limbo of a police precinct as he is forced to confront his past.

== Production ==
The Precinct was a co-production between the Azeri company Narimanfilm and the Georgian companies Georgianfilm and Bagira Films. Additional funding came from the Ministry of Culture and Tourism of Azerbaijan and from PAŞA Bank. The film was shot entirely in Azerbaijan on 35mm film, with Azeri and Russian dialogue and English subtitles.

== Release and reception ==
The Precinct had its debut in Azerbaijan on 23 September 2010 with showings at the Azerbaijan Cinema. It debuted in the United States at the Sunset Laemmle 5 in Los Angeles on 3 December 2010.

In 2010, the film was awarded the Special Jury Prize at the Golden Eye Film Festival. On 28 January 2012, it received a Golden Award at the 2011 California Film Awards.

For his performance, Teymur Odushev won Best Performance in an International Feature Film at the 32nd Young Artist Awards.

Stephen Farber, writing for The Hollywood Reporter, called the film "an odd mishmash of romance, supernatural fantasy and gangster melodrama," predicting the film would not go far in the Oscar ballot. While he criticized what he called clumsy dialogue and amateurish performances, Farber particularly praised the performances of Vagif Ibrahimoglu and Timur Odushev as well as the score by Andrey Doynikov. Betsey Sharkey wrote in her review for the Los Angeles Times that "[i]t's clear that Safat is trying to cover a lot of ground, using Garib's wrongdoings, and the way in which the devilish police chief (Vahif Ibrahimoglu) parses through them, to pack in a lot of the region's cultural and social history. But the actors flounder, and the devil gets preachy." She regarded the parts of the film set during Garib's youth as the "better half" of the film, praising the acting of Odushev and Nina Rakova.

== See also ==
- List of submissions to the 83rd Academy Awards for Best Foreign Language Film
- List of Azerbaijani submissions for the Academy Award for Best Foreign Language Film
