= Steppe Man =

2011 film

- Poster
- Directed by: Shamil Aliyev
- Written by: Vidadi Hasanov
- Starring: Bahruz Vagifoglu; Salome Demuria
- Cinematography: Rafiq Quliyev
- Release date: 20 November 2012 (Tallinn FF)
- Running time: 80 minutes
- Country: Azerbaijan
- Language: Azerbaijani

Steppe Man (Azerbaijani: Çölçü) is a 2012 Azerbaijani drama film directed by Shamil Aliyev. The film was selected as the Azerbaijani entry for the Best Foreign Language Film at the 86th Academy Awards, but it was not nominated.

== Premise ==
The Steppe Man is about a man who lives in the remote steppes. His father, Ulu, teaches him the subtleness of life. After his father's death, the man meets a city woman, which starts a new chapter in his life.

== Cast ==
- Bahruz Vagifoglu
- Salome Demuria
- Vidadi Hasanov as Ulu
- Javidan Mammadly
- Vusal Mehraliyev

== Production ==
The film was shot at the Azrbaycanfilm studio.

== Screenings and accolades ==
=== Screenings ===
The film was screened at various film festivals including:

| Year | Festival | Ref. |
|---|---|---|
| 2012 | Kinoshoc, Russia | |
| 2012 | VIII Eurasia International Film Festival, Kazakhstan | |
| 2012 | XVI International Festival in Tallinn, Dark Nights | |
| 2012 | 35th Cairo International Film Festival | |
| 2012 | 13th Tbilisi International Film Festival | |
| 2013 | 24th Ankara International Film Festival | |
| 2013 | Malatya International Film Festival (MIFF) in Turkey | |
| 2013 | International Film Forum "Golden Knight 2013 | |
| 2014 | Uluslararası Van Gölü Film Festivalı | |
| 2015 | Noida International Film Festival | |

=== Accolades ===
| Date | Award | Category | Nominee | Result | Ref. |
|---|---|---|---|---|---|
| 2012 | DIDOR International Film Festival | Fairytale Reality | Steppe Man | Won | |
| 2013 | International Telekinoforuma "Together" | Creative Research | Steppe Man | Won | |
| 21-28 June 2014 | Salento International Film Festival | Best Foreign Language Feature Film | Shamil Aliyev | Nominated | |
| 21-28 June 2014 | Salento International Film Festival | Best Lead Actress in a Foreign Language Film | Salome Demuria | Nominated | |
| 2014 | Gold Movie Awards Film Festival, London | Platinum Awards | Steppe Man | Won | |
| 5-6 December 2017 | Calcutta International Cult Films Festival | Best Feature Film | Steppe Man | Nominated | |
| 11 January 2018 | Gold Movie Awards Film Festival, London | Goddess Nike Award | Steppe Man | Nominated | |
| 2018 | Cult Critic Movie Awards | Jean Luc Godard Award | Steppe Man | Won | |
| 2020 | Gralha International Monthly Film Awards, Brazil | Best Feature Film Costume Design | Steppe Man | Won | |
| 2023 | 7th Art Independent International Film Festival, India | Best Director | Steppe Man | Won | |

== See also ==
- List of submissions to the 86th Academy Awards for Best Foreign Language Film
- List of Azerbaijani submissions for the Academy Award for Best Foreign Language Film
