= Buta (film) =

2011 film

- Directed by: Ilgar Najaf
- Written by: Ilgar Najaf
- Produced by: Ilgar Najaf
- Cinematography: Giorgi Beridze
- Release date: 11 March 2011
- Running time: 98 minutes
- Country: Azerbaijan
- Language: Azerbaijani

Buta (Azerbaijani: Buta) is a 2011 Azerbaijani drama film written and directed by Ilgar Najaf. The film was selected as the Azerbaijani entry for the Best Foreign Language Oscar at the 85th Academy Awards, but it did not make it to the final shortlist. In 2011 it won the Asia Pacific Screen Award for Best Children's Feature Film.

== See also ==
- List of submissions to the 85th Academy Awards for Best Foreign Language Film
- List of Azerbaijani submissions for the Academy Award for Best Foreign Language Film
