= Elchin Musaoglu =

Azerbaijani filmmaker (born 1966)

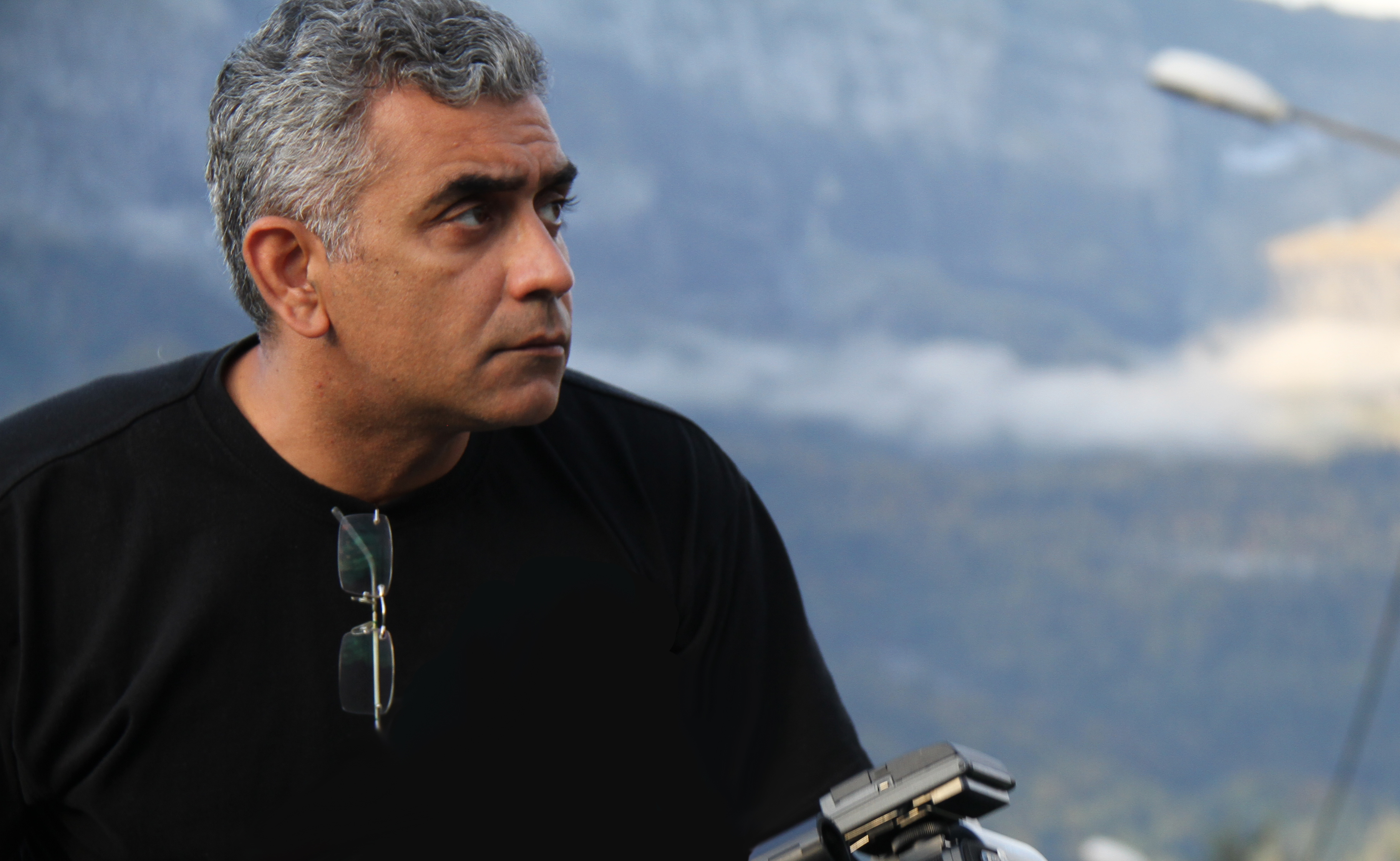
- Born: July 11, 1966 (age 60); Baku, Azerbaijan
- Education: Azerbaijan State University of Culture and Arts
- Occupation: Filmmaker

Elchin Musaoglu [Guliyev] (Azerbaijani: Elçin Musaoğlu Quliyev) is an Azerbaijani theatre and film director, screenwriter, and producer. He is best known for the award-winning feature films The 40th Door and Nabat. In 2016, he was awarded the honorary title of Honored Art Worker of the Republic of Azerbaijan. Musaoglu is a member of the European Film Academy, the Azerbaijan Professional Film Directors Guild, and the Turkish Association of Documentary Filmmakers.

== Early life ==
Elchin Musaoglu was born on 11 July 1966 in Baku. From 1983 to 1990, he studied drama directing at the Azerbaijan State University of Culture and Arts. He later continued his education at the Russian State Institute of Performing Arts in Moscow, studying in Mark Zakharov’s workshop from 1989 to 1990.

In 2003–2004, Musaoglu participated in and won the program Development of Cinema in the South Caucasus Countries, organized by the Swiss company FOCAL in Tbilisi.

== Career ==
Musaoglu began his professional career at the Jafar Jabbarli Azerbaijanfilm Film Studio and later worked at the Azerbaijantelefilm studio of Azerbaijan State Television (AZTV). Over the course of his career, he has written and directed more than 80 documentary and feature films.

His works have received awards at numerous international film festivals, and he has served as a jury member at several festivals. His most widely recognized feature films, The 40th Door (2008) and Nabat (2014), have both garnered international acclaim.

In 2005, Musaoglu founded the production company Sinema Evi. His first feature-length film, The 40th Door, won the Gold Remi Award for Best Foreign Film at the 42nd WorldFest-Houston International Film Festival in 2009.

In 2014, Nabat premiered in the Orizzonti section of the 71st Venice International Film Festival and was later included on the long list for the Academy Award for Best Foreign Language Film.

In 2017, Musaoglu founded the Young Filmmakers Club, which brought together young film professionals educated abroad as well as aspiring filmmakers interested in cinema. Over several years, the club’s members produced four short films and one feature-length film, all of which later received awards at international festivals.

Musaoglu’s most recent major work, Maryam, was produced in 2022. The screenplay received TRT’s 12 Punto Award in 2021.

He currently serves as the director of the Telefilm studio at Azerbaijan State Television.

== Awards ==
- 2006 – Glass Toys - Al Jazeera International Television Production Festival – (winner The Golden Award).

=== 2009 – The 40th Door: ===
- The 42nd Houston International Film Festival — Gold Remi Award (Best Foreign Film)
- The 11th Baku “East-West” International Film Festival — Best Debut Award
- 14th International TV Festival Bar, Montenegro — Silver Olive, Best Directing and Best Photography
- 19th Cottbus International Film Festival — Prize of the Ecumenical Jury Special Mention, and International Film Guide Inspiration Award
- Tiburon International Film Festival — Federico Fellini Award
- 6th Eurasia International Film Festival, Almaty — Jury NETPAC Award
- New York Eurasian Film Festival — Best Script Award

=== 2014 – “Nabat” filmi: ===
==== Festivals: ====
- 71st Venice International Film Festival, Italy – Orizzonti Competition
- Milan Film Festival, Italy – Le vie del cinema / I film di Venezia a Milano
- 50th Chicago International Film Festival, United States – World Cinema Program
- 38th São Paulo International Film Festival, Brazil – Competition Section
- 27th Tokyo International Film Festival, Japan – Main Competition Section
- 63rd International Filmfestival Mannheim-Heidelberg, Germany – Competition Section
- 18th Tallinn Black Nights Film Festival, Estonia – Forum / Focus on Hot Topics
- 45th International Film Festival of India, Goa, India – Competition Section
- 14th Marrakesh International Film Festival, Morocco – Competition Section
- 26th Palm Springs International Film Festival, United States – Awards Buzz Lineup
- 13th Pune International Film Festival, India – World Competition Section
- Aga Khan Museum, Toronto, Canada
- 34th Istanbul International Film Festival, Turkey – New Visions Section
- 33rd Fajr International Film Festival, Iran – Eastern Panorama Competition Section
- 26th Ankara International Film Festival, Turkey
- Tripoli Film Festival, Lebanon – Competition Section
- 9th Five Lakes Film Festival, Bavaria, Germany – Main Competition Section
- 11th Eurasia International Film Festival, Almaty, Kazakhstan – Competition Section
- 4th LET’S CEE Film Festival, Vienna, Austria – Competition Section
- 16th Arab Film Festival Tübingen, Germany – Islamic and Oriental Countries Section
- 3rd Boğaziçi Film Festival, Turkey

=== Awards ===
- Mannheim-Heidelberg Award — Mannheim-Heidelberg International Filmfestival
- International Film Critics’ Prize — Mannheim-Heidelberg International Filmfestival
- Prize by the Ecumenical Jury — Mannheim-Heidelberg International Filmfestival
- Special Mention Award — Pune International Film Festival
- Best Director — Fajr International Film Festival
- Best Film — Tripoli Film Festival, Lebanon
- Best Director — Eurasia International Film Festival
- Best Performance by an Actress — Eurasia International Film Festival
- Best Performance by an Actress — LET’S CEE Film Festival
- Best Performance by an Actress Bosphorus Film Festival

== Filmography (major films) ==
- 1990 –Leyla and Majnun (55 minutes 16 mm)
- 1994 – Killer (65 minutes TV)
- 1995 –P.S. (70 minutes TV)
- 1996 –The Third Side of the Record (35 minutes TV)
- 1997 –A Grain of Sand (49 minutes TV)
- 1997 –A Diary of a Traveller (37 minutes TV)
- 1998 – The Azerbaijan Carpet (65 minutes TV)
- 1999 –Magister Dixet (74 minutes TV)
- 2000 –Niyazi (60 minutes TV)
- 2001 –The Sun and the Cloud (28 minutes TV)
- 2002 –The Light of My Eyes (16 minutes TV)
- 2003 –Glass Toys (12 minutes TV)
- 2007 –German-Azerbaijan Friendship Relations (45 minutes TV)
- 2008 –The 40th Door (Feature film, 82 minutes 35mm)
- 2014 – Nabat (Feature film, 105 min HD)
- 2022 – Maryam (Feature film, 94 min 4K)
