= Amazing Azerbaijan =

2013 film

- Directed by: Liz Mermin
- Produced by: Aisling Ahmed
- Release date: January 2013
- Running time: 61 minutes
- Countries: Azerbaijan; Germany; England
- Language: English

Amazing Azerbaijan! is a 2013 British documentary film directed by Liz Mermin and produced by Aisling Ahmed.

== Synopsis ==
Amazing Azerbaijan! pulls back the glittery facade that this oil-rich nation presented to the world when hosting Eurovision 2012, telling personal stories of human rights abuses to which Europe’s leaders have turned a blind eye. The film looks at Azerbaijan in the run-up to the Eurovision Song Contest 2012, which took place in Baku. It features interviews with Eurovision contestants and aspiring contestants, politicians, human rights activists, investigative journalists, and members of the public, and contrasts the image the government presents to the outside world with first-person accounts of torture, arrest, and abuse by the government.

== Production ==
The film is directed by Liz Mermin, produced by Aisling Ahmed, edited by Herbert Hunger, and features music by James Burrell. It was broadcast across Europe during the week of Eurovision 2012. It is distributed by DR Sales Denmark The film received a Bertha (now Doc Society) outreach grant, at which point it was lengthened to include an interview with the 2012 Eurovision song-contest winner Loreen.

== Soundtracks ==
The documentary has these songs/scores—

- And they shall rise
- My freedom
