= Nabat (film) =

2014 film

- Film poster
- Directed by: Elchin Musaoglu
- Starring: Fatemeh Motamed-Arya
- Release date: 5 September 2014 (Venice)
- Running time: 105 minutes
- Country: Azerbaijan
- Language: Azerbaijani

Nabat (Azerbaijani: Nabat) is a 2014 Azerbaijani drama film directed by Elchin Musaoglu. The story is set during an upsurge in the Nagorno-Karabakh conflict and revolves around an old, sick ex-forestry worker and his wife Nabat, whose son has died in battle.

== Plot ==
Nabat and her ailing husband live in a small isolated house far from the nearest village but to which Nabat has to go every couple of days to sell milk from their only cow. As war approaches, the village is slowly deserted and following her husband's death, Nabat is left all alone to fend for herself. Although the Azerbaijani Armed Forces have ordered the inhabitants to leave the village, she remains, and each evening lights lamps in some of the abandoned houses and village mosque, which dissuades the enemy forces from occupying it. Nabat's only company is a gray wolf which she traps one day, but then releases. Spying the wolf later, she asks: "And why do you remain here?". Later we see why - the wolf has cubs and so she, like Nabat, is keeping the future alive. When the Azeri military decides to re-take the village, which would allow the inhabitants to return, Nabat dies as the first winter snows fall, seated on the bench outside her home.

== Honours ==
The film was selected as the Azerbaijani entry for the Best Foreign Language Film at the 87th Academy Awards, but was not nominated.

== Cast ==
- Fatemah Motamed-Aria as Nabat
- Vidadi Aliyev as Iskender
- Sabir Mammadov as Major
- Farhad Israfilov as Davud

== See also ==
- List of submissions to the 87th Academy Awards for Best Foreign Language Film
- List of Azerbaijani submissions for the Academy Award for Best Foreign Language Film
