= Balıqçılar =

- Municipality
- Location within Azerbaijan
- Coordinates: 38°56′20″N 48°55′26″E
- Country: Azerbaijan
- Rayon: Lankaran

Population (2008)
  - Total: 2,455
- Time zone: UTC+4 (AZT)
  - Summer (DST): UTC+5 (AZT)

Balıqçılar (also, Pamyat’ Lenina) is a village and municipality in the Lankaran Rayon of Azerbaijan. It has a population of 2,455 (2008).
