= Deadman's Bluff =

- Code: 2002
- Rules required: Cutthroat: The Shadow Wars
- Authors: Nathan Kaylor
- First published: 2000

Deadman's Bluff (ISBN 9781930312012) is an adventure module published in 2000 for Cutthroat: The Shadow Wars roleplaying game. It's the first (and last) of the "Quest Series" product line and its StormWorld Games product code is 2002. This module was developed and intended for use with Cutthroat: The Shadow Wars.

== Credits ==
- Nathan Kaylor, Design, Graphic Design
- Jason Walton, Cover artist
- Jason Walton, Nathan Kaylor, Interior artists

== Plot summary ==
After an ancient evil is awakened by a foolhardy tomb robber, the characters are forced to set things right by braving deadly traps and hideous monsters in the glacial caverns north of Skaev known as Deadman's Bluff. Designed as an adventure module for novice characters.
