= Cutthroat: The Shadow Wars =

- Designers: Nathan Kaylor
- Publishers: StormWorld Games
- Publication: 1988 (Original); 1997 (Abridged Electronic PDF Edition); 1999 (First Revision)
- Years active: 1988-2000
- Genres: Dark Fantasy; Thieves
- Systems: d20 (Original and 1st revision), d12 (electronic edition)

Cutthroat: The Shadow Wars (abbreviated CTSW) is a fantasy role-playing game designed by Nathan Kaylor and first published by StormWorld Games in 1988.

== Setting ==
Centered on thieves and roguish adventure in a sprawling city state known as Skaev, the game is dark in tone and designed with a mature audience in mind. For example, prostitution, drugs & alcohol, and all other manner of illicit themes are very prominent in the game.

The revised 1999 edition features a large fold-out map of the city.

== Gameplay ==
=== Prime attributes ===
Six prime attributes define characters in CTSW:

- Might (M) determines how much damage the character can take and dish out, as well as how much he can carry or lift.
- Agility (A) measures the character's sense of balance and how quickly they can move on the feet.
- Dexterity (D) affects the character's hand-eye coordination and accuracy with ranged weapons.
- Perception (P) measures how alert the character is as well as their powers of observation.
- Charisma (C) represents the characters persuasiveness, physical beauty, and leadership ability.
- Guile (G) represents the character's ability to think on their feet as well as their overall IQ.

Some editions add the following prime attributes:

- Dejrah measures the character's inherent magical ability, which in turn affects their ability to use magic.

Each attribute is rated from -5 to +5 and are affected by which character race the player selects.

=== Character races ===
The game features the standard fare of fantasy character races, such as elves and dwarves, as well as an anthropomorphic race of rat men called Skravoch. The original rules published in 1988 included a race of vampires called Nosferatu, but this was omitted from the revised 1999 edition.

=== Character classes ===
There are no character classes in the game. Instead, all characters are some manner of criminal as defined loosely by character templates. The templates offer suggestions as to what skills the player should give their character for role-playing certain types of criminals. For example, a burglar character relies heavily on agility and stealth skills, whereas a bandit focuses mainly on brute force and combat skills.

=== Starting equipment and money ===
A character's starting wealth is determined by the character's social class.

=== Combat ===
Combat is handled using the trademarked "Sudden Death" system, in which characters make a skill check with the weapon being used. The difficulty of the check is determined by the opponent's evasion rating. Success means the weapon hits and forces the target to make a damage resistance check versus the damage rating of the attack. If the check fails, the target dies (or become incapacitated). Hence, "Sudden Death" - albeit simple, but effective combat system.

=== Skill & Crisis Checks ===
All other checks are made by rolling 1d20 and adding the relevant attribute or skill modifier and compared to the task rating.

=== Innovations ===
Cutthroat: The Shadow Wars introduced multiple innovations to the role-playing games of the time, including:

- A core d20 task resolution mechanic that predates D&D 3e by nearly 11 years.
- A very deadly combat system that allows for instant kills with just about any weapon.
- A magic system that allows players to craft their own spells and cast them at-will using skill checks. The more complex the spell, the harder it is to cast.

Cutthroat: The Shadow Wars was also one of the first RPGs to be published electronically in 1997 along with FASA's Earthdawn.

== History ==
Originally published as simply Cutthroat Roleplaying, Cutthroat: The Shadow Wars was first released in 1988 as a collection of six core rulebooks; Book 1: The Basics, Book 2: Skills & Magic, Book 3: Thieving & Combat, Book 4: Skaev, Book 5: The Game Director, and Book 6: Beasts & Monsters. The original books were saddle-stitched with black and white photocopied pages. In 1997, Hypercult Publishing released an abridged electronic version of the game that revised the game to use a similar skill vs. difficulty task resolution system that was based on d12 instead of d20. This version was short-lived, and the designers eventually revisited the game in 1999 with a revised version of the original 1988 edition in a consolidated printed volume featuring a full-color cover. The name was officially changed to Cutthroat: The Shadow Wars so as not to be confused with the previous electronic version.

The game officially went out of print sometime in 2000, shortly after the release of Dungeons and Dragons 3rd Edition.

== Adventure Modules and Supplements ==
There were five official supplements published for Cutthroat Roleplaying and CTSW:

- Skravoch Tenement (1989)
- Fargryn's Folly (1990)
- The Den of Jackals (1990)
- Deadman's Bluff (1999)
- A Night in Skaev (2000)

All are long out of print and exceedingly rare.
