= 2013 Sophia Awards =

1st Sophia Awards
- Date: October 6, 2013
- Site: São Carlos National Theatre, Lisbon, Portugal

Highlights
- Best Picture: Tabu
- Most awards: Florbela (6)
- Most nominations: Florbela (15)

The 2013 Sophia Awards (Portuguese: Prémios Sophia 2013) were the 2013 edition of the Sophia Awards, an award presented by the Portuguese Academy of Cinema to honour the best in Portuguese filmmaking. The award ceremony took place on October 6, 2013 at the São Carlos National Theatre in Lisbon, Portugal.

== Winners and nominees ==
=== Awards ===
Winners are listed first and highlighted in boldface.

Best Film	Best Leading Actor
**Tabu**; Florbela; Lines of Wellington; Operação Outono	**Carlos Santos – Operação Outono**; Albano Jerónimo – Florbela; Vitor Norte – Aristides de Sousa Mendes – O Cônsul de Bordéus; Ivo Canelas – Florbela
Best Leading Actress	Best Supporting Actor
**Dalila Carmo – Florbela**; Laura Soveral – Tabu; Teresa Madruga – Tabu; Rita Durão – A Vingança de uma Mulher	**Albano Jerónimo – Lines of Wellington**; António Fonseca – Florbela; Adriano Luz – Lines of Wellington; Nuno Melo – Estrada de Palha; Carlos Paulo – Aristides de Sousa Mendes – O Cônsul de Bordéus; João Reis – Em Câmara Lenta; Luís Miguel Cintra – O Gebo e a Sombra
Best Supporting Actress	Best Original Screenplay
**Anabela Teixeira – Florbela**; Maria João Bastos – A Moral Conjugal; Elisa Lisboa – A Teia de Gelo; Maria João Luís – Em Câmara Lenta; Carla Chambel – Operação Outono	**Carlos Saboga – Lines of Wellington**; Vicente Alves do Ó – Florbela; Pedro Lopes – Assim Assim; Rodrigo Areias – Estrada de Palha; Margarida Gil and Maria Velho da Costa – Paixão
Best Adapted Screenplay	Best Director
**Bruno de Almeida, Frederico Delgado Rosa and John Frey – Operação Outono**; Rui Cardoso Martins – Em Câmara Lenta; Manoel de Oliveira – O Gebo e a Sombra; António Torrado and João Nunes – Aristides de Sousa Mendes – O Cônsul de Bordéus	**Vicente Alves do Ó – Florbela**; Miguel Gomes – Tabu; Bruno de Almeida – Operação Outono; Rodrigo Areias – Estrada de Palha; Francisco Manso and João Correa – Aristides de Sousa Mendes – O Cônsul de Bordéus
Best Cinematography	Best Artistic Direction
**Luís Branquinho – Florbela**; Rui Poças – Tabu; André Szankowski – Lines of Wellington; Acácio de Almeida – Paixão	**Isabel Branco – Lines of Wellington**; Sílvia Grabowski – Florbela; Zé Branco – Operação Outono; Fernanda Morais – Aristides de Sousa Mendes – O Cônsul de Bordéus
Best Sound	Best Wardrobe
**Jaime Barros, Tiago Matos and Elsa Ferreira – Florbela**; Ricardo Leal, António Lopes, José Moreira and Miguel Martins – Lines of Wellington; Vasco Pimentel, Joaquim Pinto and Nuno Leonel – A Vingança de uma Mulher; Quintino Bastos and Vasco Carvalho – A Moral Conjugal; Ricardo Leal and Miguel Martins – Operação Outono; Vasco Pimentel, Miguel Martins and António Lopes – Tabu	**Sílvia Grabowski – Florbela**; Tânia Franco – Lines of Wellington; Lucha D’Orey – Operação Outono; Susana Abreu – Estrada de Palha
Best Makeup and Hairstyling	Best Film Editing
**Íris Peleira – Lines of Wellington**; Aracelli Fuente Basconcillos and Donna Meirelles – Tabu; Abigail Machado and Mário Leal – Florbela; Sandra Pinto and Ana Ferreira – Aristides de Sousa Mendes – o Cônsul Bordéus	**Telmo Churro and Miguel Gomes – Tabu**; João Braz – Florbela; Tomás Baltazar – Estrada de Palha; Roberto Perpignani – Operação Outono
Best Music	Best Documentary – Feature
**The Legendary Tigerman and Rita Redshoes – Estrada de Palha**; Guga Bernado – Florbela; Joana Sá – Tabu; Dead Combo – Operação Outono	**É na Terra não é na Lua – Gonçalo Tocha**; Linha Vermelha – José Filipe Costa; Kolé San Jon é Festa di Kau Berdi – Rui Simões; Cartas de Angola – Dulce Fernandes
Best Fiction Short Film	Best Animated Short Film
**Cerro Negro – João Salaviza**; Luz da Manhã – Cláudia Varejão; O dia mais feliz da tua vida – Adriano Luz; O Facínora – Paulo Abreu	**Kali, o pequeno vampiro – Regina Pessoa**; Sem querer – João Fazenda; Lágrimas de um palhaço – Cláudio Sá; Do céu e da terra – Isabel Aboim Inglez
Best Documentary – Short
**Raúl Brandão Era Um Grande Escritor – João Canijo**; A Rua da Estrada – Graça Castanheira; A Comunidade – Salomé Lamas; A Luz da Terra Antiga – Luís Oliveira Santos

=== Other awards ===
==== Career Awards ====
- Acácio de Almeida
- José Manuel Castello Lopes
- Laura Soveral

==== Sophia Award of Merit and Excellency ====
- Manoel de Oliveira

=== Films with multiple nominations and awards ===
The following 11 films received multiple nominations:

Nominations	Film
15	Florbela
10	Operação Outono
9	Lines of Wellington
9	Tabu
6	Aristides de Sousa Mendes – O Cônsul de Bordéus
6	Estrada de Palha
3	Em Câmara Lenta
2	O Gebo e a Sombra
2	A Moral Conjugal
2	Paixão
2	A Vingança de uma Mulher

The following 4 films received multiple awards:

Awards	Film
6	Florbela
4	Lines of Wellington
2	Tabu
2	Operação Outono
