= List of Angolan films =

This is a sortable list of films produced in Angola, many in the Portuguese language.

== Features ==
Year	Title	Director	Genre	Notes
1970	Des fusils pour Banta		Political drama	Angola or Guinea-Bissau?
1973	A proposito dell'Angola	Augusta Conchiglia e Stefano de Stefani	Documentary	79min
1973	Sambizanga	Sarah Maldoror	Drama	97min
1977	O Golpe	Francisco Henriques	Documentary	
1977	Ponto da situação	Francisco Henriques	TV doc	58min
1977	Faz lá Coragem Camarada	Ruy Duarte de Carvalho	Political drama	120min
1978	O Ritmo do N'gola Ritmos	António Ole	Documentary	59min
1979	Presente Angolano: Tempo Mumuila	Ruy Duarte de Carvalho	Documentary	6h, TV miniseries; 10 ep. bw: A Huila e os Mumuilas (16 min) Lua da Seca Menor (60 min) Haydongo, o valor de um homem (45') Pedra Sozinha não sustém panela (36') O Kimbanda Kambia (41min) Oficios (29min) Ekwenge (25min) Makumukas (27') Kimbanda (21', c) Ondyelwa, a festa do boi sagrado (42', colour)
1980	Luimbi	Henrique Ruivo Alves e Manuel Tomás Francisco (ambos sob o pseudónimo de Njenji)		
1980	No caminho das estrelas	António Ole		56min
1981	Pamberi ne Zimbabwe	Carlos Henriques, João Costa		50min, co-prod Angola-Moçambique
1982	Memoria de um Dia	Orlando Fortunato		
1982	Nelisita	Ruy Duarte de Carvalho	fiction	64min, Olunyaneka, with Portuguese subtitles
1989	Comboio da Canhoca	Orlando Fortunato		Final version, 2004. 90min
1991	Mopiopio	Zézé Gamboa	Documentary	55min
1992	Caravana	Rogelio Paris & Júlio César Rodriguez		co-prod Cuba & Angola
1993	O Miradouro da Lua	Jorge António		co-production Portugal-Angola
1996	Les Oubliées	Anne-Laure Folly	Documentary	53min, Portuguese with French subtitles
1998	Dissidence	Zézé Gamboa	Documentary	55min
2004	The Hero	Zézé Gamboa	Drama	co-prod Angola, Portugal, France
2004	Hollow City	Maria João Ganga	Drama	
2005	Angola: histórias da música popular	Jorge António	Documentary	55min
2007	Oxalá cresçam Pitangas	Ondjaki, Kiluanje Liberdade	Documentary	
2012	The Great Kilapy	Zézé Gamboa	comedy-drama	
2012	Death Metal Angola	Jeremy Xido	Documentary	
2012	Tchinhango	Tiago Figueiredo	Documentary	
2013	Njinga: Queen Of Angola	Sérgio Graciano	historical epic	
2015	Independência: esta é a nossa memória	Mário Bastos	Documentary	
2015	Deuses da Água	Pablo César	fiction	co-prod Argentina / Angola
2017	A Ilha dos Cães	Jorge António		shot in São Tomé e Principe
2017	Do Outro Lado do Mundo	Sérgio Afonso	Documentary	
2019	Para Lá dos Meus Passos	Kamy Lara	Documentary	72 min, Portuguese with English and French subtitles
2020	Air Conditioner	Fradique	Drama	
2022	Nossa Senhora da Loja do Chinês	Ery Claver	Drama	
2022	Ludvania	João Pedro	Drama	95min

== Mediums and Shorts ==
Year	Title	Director	Genre	Notes
1970	Monangambe	Sarah Maldoror		17min
1975	Uma Festa para Viver	Ruy Duarte de Carvalho	TV documentary	22min
1975	Geração 50	Ruy Duarte de Carvalho	Documentary	24min
1976	A Luta Continua	Asdrubal Rebelo e Bruno Muel	Documentary	22min
1977	Eu Sou, Eu Era, Eu Quero Ser... Pioneiro Político	Henrique Ruivo Alves	Documentary	
1978	Nascidos na Luta, Vivendo a Vitória	Asdrubal Rebelo	TV Documentary	22min
1978	Carnaval da vitoria	António Ole		40min
1980	Kiala Mukanga (É Tudo às Claras)	Henrique Ruivo Alves e Manuel Tomás Francisco (ambos sob o pseudónimo de Njenji)		41 min
1981	Rebita	Manuel Costa e Silva (coord. collective direction)		
1982	Conceição Tchiambula: um dia, uma vida	António Ole	Documentary	30min
1982	O Balanço do Tempo na Cena de Angola	Ruy Duarte de Carvalho	Documentary	43min
1986	Levanta, voa, vamos	Asdrubal Rebelo	Documentary	22min
1988	Caribeando	Mariano Bartolomeu	fiction, prod. Cuba	10min
1991	Quem faz correr Quim	Mariano Bartolomeu	fiction	22min
1996	O Sol ainda brilha	Mariano Bartolomeu	Documentary	
2001	Burned By Blue	Zezé Gamboa	Documentary	26min
2002	O Desassossego de Pessoa	Zezé Gamboa	Documentary	10min
2003	O Contador de Histórias	Mariano Bartolomeu		30min
2008	Uma Noite Perfeita para Falar de Amor	Mariano Bartolomeu		30min
2010	Alambamento	Mário Bastos	Documentary	15min
2014	Afripidia x Angola	Teddy Goitom & Benjamin Taft	Documentary	30min
2016	Os ouvidos que ouvem	Hugo Salvaterra	fiction, co-prod EUA	30min
2017	Havemos de voltar	Kiluanji Kia Henda	fiction	10min
2018	Paisagens Propícias	Jorge António, Graça Castanheira	Documentary	
2018	Não olhes, se não vês	Mário Bastos		1min
2018	Lúcia, no céu, com semáforos	Ery Claver		15min
2019	1999	Hugo Salvaterra	fiction, co-prod EUA	17min

== Films set in Angola - features ==
Year	Title	Director	Genre	Notes
1968	Riusciranno i nostri eroi a ritrovare l'amico misteriosamente scomparso in Africa?	Ettore Scola	fiction	
1974	Malteses, burgueses e às vezes		fiction	100min
1997	Rostov-Luanda	Abderrahmane Sissako	Documentary	
1998	Sweepers	Keoni Waxman	action adventure drama	
2007	Adeus, até amanhã	António Escudeiro	Documentary	
2008	Kangamba	Rogelio Paris		
2009	Luanda, a Fábrica da Música	Kiluanje Liberdade, Inês Gonçalves	Documentary	
2013	De Armas e bagagens	Ana Delgado Martins	Documentary	72min
2013	Ole, António Ole	Rui Simões	Documentary	77min
2016	An Outpost of Progress (Posto Avançado do Progresso)	Hugo Vieira da Silva	fiction	120min
2016	Letters from War (cartas da guerra)	Ivo Ferreira	fiction	105min
2016	Kayak the Kwanza	Oscar Scafidi	Documentary	
2018	Another Day of Life	Raúl de la Fuente, Damian Nenow		
2018	Into the Okavango	Neil Gelinas	Documentary	
2019	Serpentarius	Carlos Conceição	fiction	
2022	Nayola	José Miguel Ribeiro	Animation	90min

== Films set in Angola - mediums and shorts ==
Year	Title	Director	Genre	Notes
2013	Honey]	Adelina Antónia, Martin Gruber, Miguel S. Hilario, Henriques Bino Job, Fatima Jose & Evaristo Quintas	Documentary	39min
2016	Making a Living in the Dry Season | Fazer pela vida na estação seca	Inês Ponte	Documentary	36min
2019	A Story from Africa	Bill Woodberry	photo-film	33min

== See also ==
- Cinema of Angola
- Culture of Angola
- List of African films
