= Zézé Gamboa =

Angolan film director

Zézé Gambosa
- Born: José Augusto Octávio Gamboa dos Passos; 1955 (age 70–71); Luanda
- Other names: Zézé Gambosa
- Citizenship: Angolan
- Occupation: Film Director

José Augusto Octávio Gamboa dos Passos, known as Zézé Gamboa (born 1955) is an Angolan film director.

== Life ==
Zézé Gamboa was born in Luanda in 1955. He started working as a news producer in Angolan television in May 1974. In 1980 he moved to Europe, spending nine years in Paris and another seven years in Belgium before eventually settling in Lisbon.

Gamboa started film-making by making documentaries. He also worked on Foreign Land (1995), directed by Walter Salles, and Napomuceno's Will, Francisco Manso's 1997 film adaptation of Germano Almeida's novel The Last Will and Testament of Senhor da Silva Araújo.

The Hero (2004) tells the story of a man attempting to recover his stolen prosthetic limb in an Angola trying to rebuild itself after the civil war. It received the Jury Prize for World Cinema at the 2005 Sundance Film Festival, among over 25 film festival awards.

Critic Olivier Barlet has characterized Gamboa's The Great Kilapy (2012), "a burlesque biopic about a professional swindler" in 1970s Angola, as using farce to "reveal the extent to which the contradictions of the colony already bore the seeds of decolonization".

== Films ==
- Mopiopio, Sopro de Angola, 1991. Documentary.
- Desassossego de Pessoa. Documentary.
- Dessidência. Documentary.
- O Herói / The Hero, 2004. Feature film.
- O Grande Kilapy / The Great Kilapy, 2012. Feature film.
