= Operation Autumn =

2012 Portuguese film

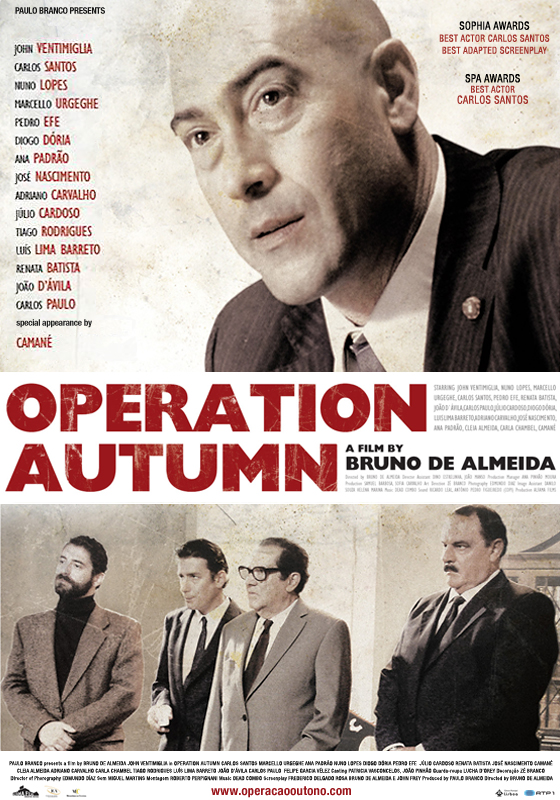
- Film poster
- Portuguese: Operação Outono
- Directed by: Bruno de Almeida
- Written by: Bruno de Almeida; Frederico Delgado Rosa; John Frey
- Produced by: Paulo Branco
- Starring: John Ventimiglia; Carlos Santos
- Cinematography: Edmundo Díaz
- Edited by: Roberto Perpignani
- Music by: Dead Combo
- Distributed by: Alfama Films
- Release date: 22 November 2012
- Running time: 92 minutes
- Country: Portugal
- Language: Portuguese

Operation Autumn (Portuguese: Operação Outono) is a 2012 film directed by Bruno de Almeida and starring John Ventimiglia and Carlos Santos. A political thriller about the operation that lead to the brutal assassination of General Humberto Delgado, killed by the Portuguese police in 1965, during the Estado Novo regime. It was released on 22 November 2012.

== Cast ==
- John Ventimiglia as Humberto Delgado
- Carlos Santos
- Ana Padrão
- Nuno Lopes
- Marcello Urgeghe
- Diogo Dória
- Camané
- Pedro Efe
- Luís Lima Barreto
- Adriano Carvalho
- José Nascimento
- Julio Cardoso
- Tiago Rodrigues
- João d'Ávila
- Renata Batista
- Carlos Paulo
- Cleia Almeida
- Carla Chambel

== Accolades ==
Award	Date	Category	Recipients and nominees	Result
Sophia Awards	October 6, 2013	Best Film	Operação Outono	Nominated
Sophia Awards	October 6, 2013	Best Leading Actor	Carlos Santos	Won
Sophia Awards	October 6, 2013	Best Supporting Actress	Carla Chambel	Nominated
Sophia Awards	October 6, 2013	Best Adapted Screenplay	Bruno de Almeida, Frederico Delgado Rosa and John Frey	Won
Sophia Awards	October 6, 2013	Best Director	Bruno de Almeida	Nominated
Sophia Awards	October 6, 2013	Best Artistic Direction	Zé Branco	Nominated
Sophia Awards	October 6, 2013	Best Sound	Ricardo Leal and Miguel Martins	Nominated
Sophia Awards	October 6, 2013	Best Wardrobe	Lucha D’Orey	Nominated
Sophia Awards	October 6, 2013	Best Film Editing	Roberto Perpignani	Nominated
Sophia Awards	October 6, 2013	Best Music	Dead Combo	Nominated
