= Napomuceno's Will =

Cape Verdean 1997 drama film

- Film poster
- Portuguese: O testamento do Senhor Napumoceno
- Directed by: Francisco Manso
- Written by: Mário Prata
- Based on: The Last Will and Testament of Senhor da Silva Araújo by Germano Almeida
- Produced by: António Gonçalo; Francisco Manso
- Starring: Nelson Xavier; Maria Ceiça; Chico Díaz; Zezé Motta; Vya Negromonte; Milton Gonçalves; Ana Firmino
- Cinematography: Edgar Moura
- Edited by: Luís Sobral
- Music by: Tito Paris; Toy Vieira
- Production company: ADR Productions; Cineluz - Produções Cinematográficas Lda.; Cobra Films; Instituto Caboverdiano de Cinema (ICC); Instituto Português da Arte Cinematográfica e Audiovisual (IPACA); J.L. Vasconcelos Lda.; Rádio e Televisão de Portugal (RTP)
- Distributed by: California Newsreel; Filmes Castello Lopes; Paris Vídeo; SPIA Media Productions Inc.
- Release dates: August 1997 (Festival de Gramado); 25 September 1997 (Cape Verde)
- Running time: 117 minutes
- Country: Cape Verde; Portugal; Brazil; France; Belgium
- Language: Portuguese

Napomuceno's Will (Portuguese: O testamento do Senhor Napumoceno, "The Will of Mr. Napumoceno") is a 1997 Cape Verdean drama film directed by Francisco Manso, based on the 1989 novel The Last Will and Testament of Senhor da Silva Araújo by Germano Almeida.

== Synopsis ==
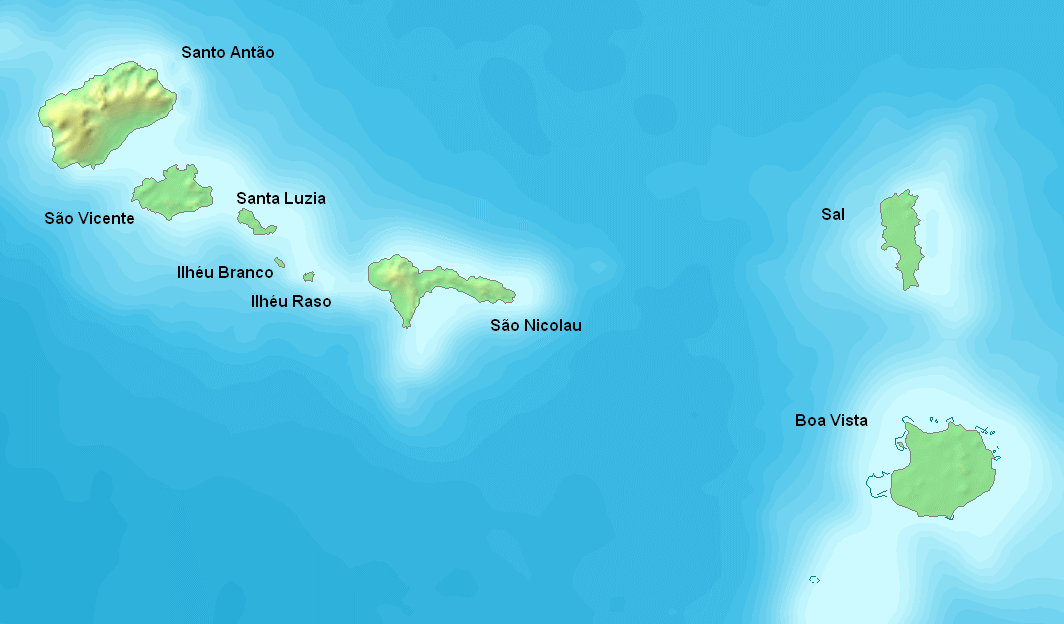
Map of Cape Verde's Barlavento Islands; Sr. Napumuceno moves from São Nicolau (middle) to São Vicente (in the west).

Napumoceno da Silva Araújo, a wealthy Cape Verde merchant, dies and unexpectedly disinherits his nephew, leaving his fortune to an illegitimate daughter. He also leaves her a collection of cassette tapes in which he tells her the story of his life, how he came from poverty to success and status, and the many women he loved along the way.

== Cast ==
- Nelson Xavier — Napumoceno da da Silva Araújo
- Maria Ceiça — Graça
- Chico Díaz — Carlos
- Zezé Motta — Eduarda
- Vya Negromonte — Mari Chica
- Milton Gonçalves — Mayor
- Elisa Lucinda — Dona Jóia
- Ana Firmino — Dona Rosa
- Cesária Évora — Arminda

== Release ==
Napomuceno's Will premiered at the Festival de Gramado, Brazil in August 1997.

It received positive reviews, Variety praising Chico Díaz in particular. For the San Francisco Chronicle, Mick LaSalle wrote that "[Xavier's] Araujo is essentially a clown, but one so dynamic and single-minded that it becomes understandable why he is attractive to women and successful in business. With a virtuosity reminiscent of Roberto Benigni, he uses his voice as a dazzling comedic instrument, rising to ear-splitting heights in moments of pomposity and exasperation. At the same time, Xavier gives us moments of heartbreaking nakedness, when Araujo's pretense drops away, and we see right into his pain."

In Contemporary Lusophone African Film, Paulo de Medeiros complained that the film ignored mentions of colonialism in the original book, pointing out that with a Portuguese director and audience, the film embraces a "Lusotropicalist" perspective or aims to forget about colonialism.
