= Maria Ceiça =

Brazilian actress, singer and performer

Maria Ceiça (born Maria da Conceição Justino de Paula in Rio de Janeiro, October 18, 1965) is a Brazilian actress, singer and performer, who has a significant career in theater, movies and television.

== Biography ==
Trained at the Martins Pena Theater School in Rio de Janeiro, she began her professional career in 1989 at the TV Globo, with the telenovela Pacto de Sangue. Since then, she has appeared in various telenovelas for TV Globo and Rede Record, interpreting highly popular characters with Brazilian and Portuguese public audiences, such as Tuquinha Batista in the telenovela Felicidade or Márcia in Por Amor.

Winner of the Andorinha Trophy, Special Jury Prize at the Film Festival of Portuguese Language Countries, in 2006 and honored by a Special Tribute at the African Film Festival in New York City in 2005, she has starred in many films, including several important Brazilian and international productions, such as Filhas do Vento (Brazil), winner of 6 Kikitos (Awards) at the Gramado Festival (the most important Brazilian cinema festival), Cruz e Sousa, o poeta do Desterro ( Brazil ), and Se eu fosse você (Brazil). She played the lead female role in the internationally acclaimed movies, Testamento (Cape Verde, 1997), winner of Best Film Kikito at the Gramado Festival and several other international awards in 1997, and The Hero (Angola, 2004), winner of the Sundance Film Festival Grand Jury Prize in 2004 and other awards.

In theater, she has performed in more than 15 pieces on all stages of Brazil, including major hits such as Boeing - Boeing, A Lua que me Instrua, and The Blacks from Jean Genet. She has also performed as a singer in two shows, based on Brazilian Popular Music (MPB). Since 1997, she has also performed for TV Escola, an educational channel aimed at teachers and students from Brazilian public schools. In 2007, she served as Superintendent (Coordinator) of Racial Equality at the Secretariat of Social Assistance and Human Rights of the State of Rio de Janeiro. Currently, Maria Ceiça runs her own production company, the Luminis Produtora Produções Artísticas.

== Filmography ==
- 2012 - The Great Kilapy - Mãe de Joãozinho
- 2006 - Se Eu Fosse Você - Márcia
- 2005 - Daughters of the Wind (Filhas do Vento) - Selminha
- 2004 - The Hero - Maria Bárbara
- 2003 - Rua Alguem 5555: My Father - First Newsman
- 2003 - Aleijadinho - Paixão, Glória e Suplício - Helena
- 1999 - Orfeu - Carmen
- 1998 - Cruz e Sousa, o Poeta do Desterro - Gavíria
- 1997 - Napomuceno's Will - Graça
- 1995 - Carlota Joaquina, Princess of Brazil - Gertrudes

== TV works ==
- 2023 - Elas por Elas - Marlene
- 2015 - Os Dez Mandamentos - Nayla
- 2010 - A História de Ester - Quinlá
- 2008 - Os Mutantes: Caminhos do Coração - Rosana Magalhães
- 2007 - Caminhos do Coração - Rosana Magalhães
- 2005 - Prova de Amor - Marília Padilha
- 2000 - Uga-Uga - Rosa
- 1999 - Chiquinha Gonzaga - Divina
- 1997 - Por Amor - Márcia
- 1995 - Tocaia Grande - Rufina
- 1993 - Fera Ferida - Engrácia dos Anjos
- 1991 - Felicidade - Tuquinha Batista
- 1990 - Mãe de Santo (miniseries)
- 1989 - Pacto de Sangue - Joana
