= The Consul of Bordeaux =

- Film poster
- Portuguese: O Cônsul de Bordéus
- Directed by: Francisco Manso; João Correa
- Screenplay by: António Torrado; João Nunes
- Starring: Vítor Norte; Carlos Paulo
- Release date: November 8, 2012
- Running time: 90 minutes
- Country: Portugal
- Language: Portuguese

The Consul of Bordeaux (Portuguese: O Cônsul de Bordéus) is a 2012 Portuguese biographical historical drama film directed by Francisco Manso and João Correa and starring Vítor Norte as Aristides de Sousa Mendes. It was released on 8 November 2012. The film was shot in Viana do Castelo and Bordeaux.

== Cast ==
- Vítor Norte as Aristides de Sousa Mendes
- Carlos Paulo as Chaim Kruger
- Leonor Seixas
- Laura Soveral
- Pedro Cunha
- Joaquim Nicolau
- São José Correia
- Manuel de Blas
- Miguel Borines

== Reception ==
=== Critical response ===
Jorge Mourinha, on Público, gave the film a rating of one out of five stars.

=== Accolades ===
Award	Date	Category	Recipients and nominees	Result
Sophia Awards	October 6, 2013	Best Leading Actor	Vítor Norte	Nominated
Sophia Awards	October 6, 2013	Best Supporting Actor	Carlos Paulo	Nominated
Sophia Awards	October 6, 2013	Best Adapted Screenplay	António Torrado and João Nunes	Nominated
Sophia Awards	October 6, 2013	Best Director	Francisco Manso and João Correa	Nominated
Sophia Awards	October 6, 2013	Best Artistic Direction	Fernanda Morais	Nominated
Sophia Awards	October 6, 2013	Best Makeup and Hairstyling	Sandra Pinto and Ana Ferreira	Nominated
