= Dot.Com (film) =

- Directed by: Luís Galvão Teles
- Starring: María Adánez; João Tempera; Marco Delgado; Isabel Abreu; Margarida Carpinteiro
- Release date: 2007
- Country: Portugal
- Language: Portuguese

Dot.Com is a 2008 Portuguese comedy film directed by Luís Galvão Teles and starring María Adánez, João Tempera, Marco Delgado, Isabel Abreu, and Margarida Carpinteiro. The film was nominated in the comedy category at the Rio de Janeiro International Film Festival 2007, and won the Prémio do Público, public prize, at the XV Caminhos do Cinema Português (2008). The film was shown in the US in 2008, but was not released in Germany till 2010, where it was well received.

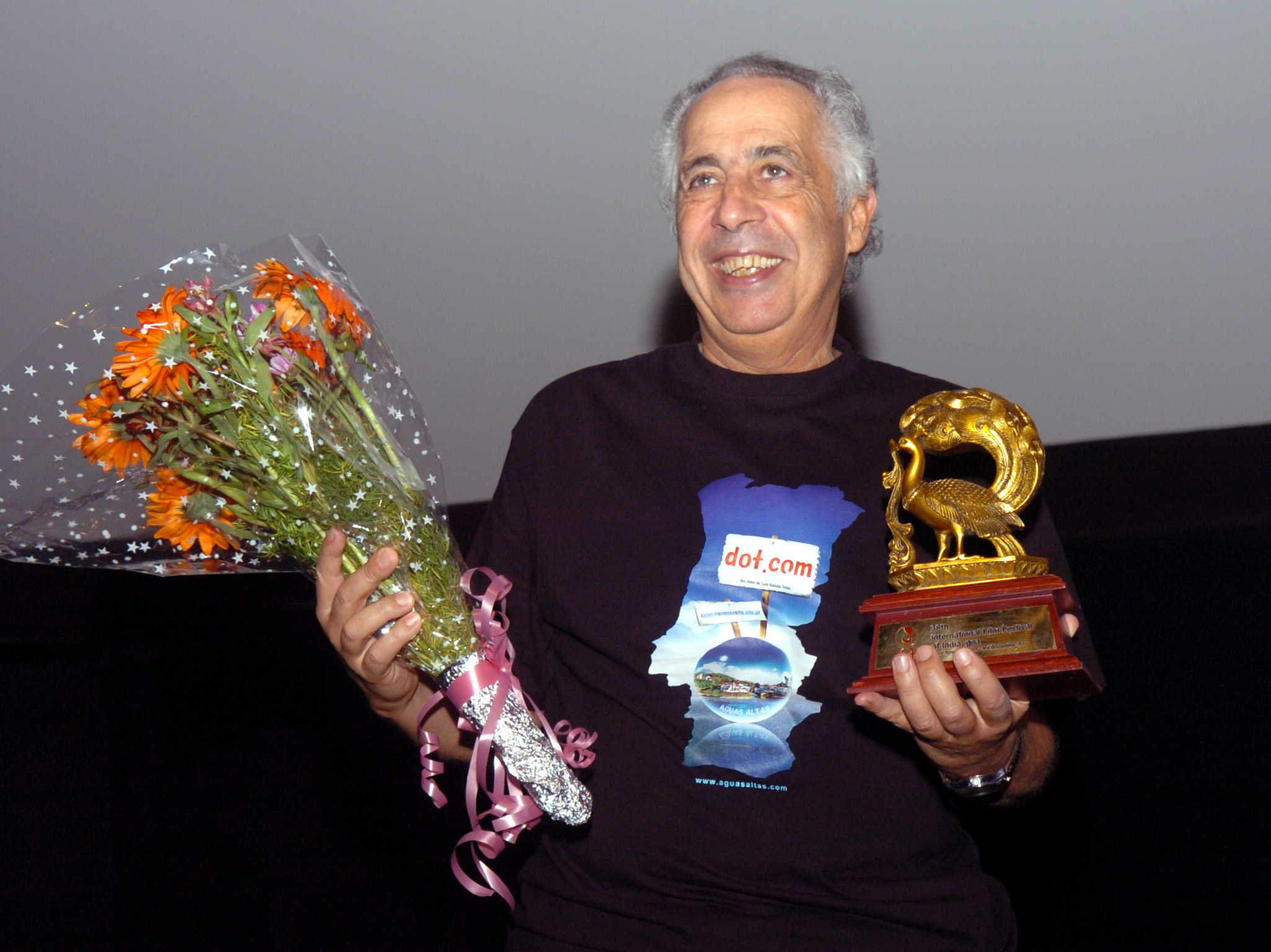
Teles at IFFI 2007
