= Hay Road =

2012 film

- Film poster
- Portuguese: Estrada de Palha
- Directed by: Rodrigo Areias
- Written by: Rodrigo Areias
- Starring: Nuno Melo
- Edited by: Tomás Baltazar
- Music by: The Legendary Tigerman; Rita Redshoes
- Release date: 28 June 2012
- Running time: 120 minutes
- Country: Portugal
- Language: Portuguese

Hay Road (Portuguese: Estrada de Palha) is a 2012 Portuguese action adventure Western film directed by Rodrigo Areias.

== Plot ==
The film is set in the 1900s.

== Cast ==
- Nuno Melo

== Reception ==
=== Critical response ===
On Público, Vasco Câmara gave the film a rating of one out of five stars, Jorge Mourinha gave it three out of five, and Luís Miguel Oliveira gave it two out of five.

=== Accolades ===
Award	Date	Category	Recipients and nominees	Result
Sophia Awards	October 6, 2013	Best Supporting Actor	Nuno Melo	Nominated
Sophia Awards	October 6, 2013	Best Original Screenplay	Rodrigo Areias	Nominated
Sophia Awards	October 6, 2013	Best Director	Rodrigo Areias	Nominated
Sophia Awards	October 6, 2013	Best Wardrobe	Susana Abreu	Nominated
Sophia Awards	October 6, 2013	Best Film Editing	Tomás Baltazar	Nominated
Sophia Awards	October 6, 2013	Best Music	The Legendary Tigerman and Rita Redshoes	Won
