= Nuno Melo =

Nuno Melo may refer to:

- Nuno Melo (politician), Portuguese politician
- Nuno Melo (actor), Portuguese actor
