= South (TV series) =

Portuguese television series

- Portuguese: Sul
- Genre: Crime
- Created by: Edgar Medina; Guilherme Mendonça; Rui Cardoso Martins
- Screenplay by: Edgar Medina; Guilherme Mendonça; Rui Cardoso Martins
- Directed by: Ivo M. Ferreira
- Starring: Adriano Luz; Jani Zhao; Afonso Pimentel; Margarida Vila-Nova; Ivo Canelas; Beatriz Batarda; Nuno Lopes; Margarida Marinho; José Raposo; Adriano Carvalho; Miguel Guilherme; Miguel Seabra; Américo Silva
- Country of origin: Portugal
- No. of seasons: 1
- No. of episodes: 9

Production
- Producer: Edgar Medina
- Cinematography: Pedro Cardeira
- Editor: Sandro Aguilar

Original release
- Network: RTP1
- Release: September 28 – November 23, 2019

South (Portuguese: Sul) is a Portuguese police noir, in nine episodes, created by Edgar Medina and Guilherme Mendonça, directed by Ivo M. Ferreira and produced by Arquipélago Filmes. Soundtrack by Dead Combo. The series premiered on the 28 September 2019, on RTP1, and broadcast ended on the 23 November 2019.

== Synopsis ==
A nihilistic and socially awkward police inspector of the Criminal Investigation Unit probes a string of suspicious deaths by drowning in the Tagus River. As the investigation becomes murkier, help comes from an unexpected source. Meanwhile, the country reels from an intense economic and social crisis.

== Reception ==
South series was recognized as "a milestone for Portuguese audiovisual landscape", being the first national television series to be selected for presentation in the CoPro Series in 2018, a section of Berlinale's Co-Production Market, integrating the list of 8 international drama series to be presented in the festival's co-production market. In 2019, the series returned to the Berlin International Film Festival to show the first episode, in the Drama Series Days (EFM / Berlinale) section.

The nine episodes of the series were shown between 28 September and 23 November 2019, on RTP1. The series was recognized by national and international critics, having been praised for its technical and narrative quality, considered the best Portuguese series of the year and equated with the best series produced in the world.

"That the series was screened in Berlin is proof South stands alongside the top-quality TV dramas now being produced around the world. All eyes will now be on Portugal to see whether the country can follow Spain's footsteps in establishing itself as a storytelling force on the international stage." Michael Pickard, Drama Quarterly, October 2019

"The biggest surprise comes unexpectedly from Portugal with a very well structured thriller and, above all, very illustrative of the serious Portuguese economic situation five years ago, without hesitating to criticize all levels thanks to the great character of Humberto, a loser who has nothing more to lose and will go deep to discover the network behind that first crime." Lorenzo Mejino, El Diario Vasco, December 2019

"And, what matters most: people, people from Lisbon, that we see so little of in our novels, movies or newspapers. A series called South, as if an appeal to depart, when its story, sound and forms, and people above all, grab us to stay. (...) I suspect another game will be coming to our homes in the upcoming weeks: Will the screenwriters have the nerve, during the next season to be filmed in 2020, to remove from our 2021 Saturdays' company, those who we came to love in 2019? The viewers anguish for fear of the disappearance of any of those artists, in which we will find good characters, is an extra bonus from South." Ferreira Fernandes, Diário de Notícias, October 2019

"It was also in the middle of Lisbon's transition that Edgar Medina started to write South, the best Portuguese series of 2019 and one of the best of the year (RTP1). Lisbon is a noir detective story in the troika's ballad that is South, and we can feel the urgency that Guilherme Mendonça, Rui Cardoso Martins e Ivo M. Ferreira felt to tell the history of a town that has already started to fade from memory - the same one that lived in this decade, before tourists, Airbnb and cruises, a ghost in the pre-Web Summit machine of Sócrates and Ricardo Salgado, populated by entrepreneurs, policemen, bankers and politicians." Joana Amaral Cardoso, Público, December 2019

On 24 August 2020, the series became available in the catalog of the streaming service HBO Portugal.

In 2020, the series was distinguished with the Sophia Award from the Portuguese Academy of Cinema for Best Series / Television and the Authors Award from the Portuguese Society of Authors for Best Fiction Program. Sul also reached the shortlist of nominees for the Ibero-American Cinema awards, Premios Platino Xcaret, in the category of Best TV Series (among other categories).

== Cast ==
- Adriano Luz as Humberto
- Jani Zhao as Alice
- Afonso Pimentel as Matilha
- Margarida Vila-Nova as Mafalda
- Ivo Canelas as Pastor Santoro
- Beatriz Batarda as Journalist
- Nuno Lopes as inspector Rebelo
- Margarida Marinho as Rosário
- José Raposo as Veríssimo
- Adriano Carvalho as Inspector-Chief
- Miguel Guilherme as Dário Monteiro
- Miguel Seabra as Xavier
- Américo Silva as Pedro Chambell

== Additional cast ==
- Francisco Tavares as Real Estate Agent
- António Fonseca as Coroner
- Maria João Abreu as Alexandra Chambel
- Duarte Grilo as Valério
- Rita Cabaço as Guida
- Andreia Bento as Berta
- Eric Santos as Pastor Santoro Henchmen
- Paula Só as D. Helena
- Estevâo Antunes as Pastor Santoro Henchmen 2
- Paulo Calatré as Inspector Júdice
- Jaime Freitas as Inspetor Dâmaso
- Leonor Silveira as employment center employee
- Pedro Inês as Chico
- Isabél Zuaa as Young Smith
- Manuel Moreira as Director Plantae\
- Beatriz Menino as Ana
- Custódia Gallego as Makeup Artist
- João Pedro Mamede as Kiko
- Isac Graça as Joka
- Filipa Cardoso as Celestina Verónica
- Paula Guedes as Mimi
- Sara Belo as Ex-wife
- Paulo Nery as Mayor
- Maria João Pinho as Mayor’s Wife
- Guilherme Filipe as Fortunato Santos
- Cândido Ferreira as Henrique Maia
- Isaac Carvalho as Babysitting Kid
- Matita Ferreira as Babysitting Kid 2
- Miguel Nunes as Nuno
- Ivo Alexandre as police officer
- Lydie Barbara as nurse
- Pedro Barbeitos as port security
- Raimundo Cosme as churchgoer
- Miguel Monteiro as guard
- Emanuele Simontacchi
- Nicolas Brites

== Episodes ==
№	Title	First aired	Audience	Share
1	"Episode 1"	28-09-2019	427 500	10%
2	"Episode 2"	5-10-2019	389 500	9,1%
3	"Episode 3"	12-10-2019	ASD	ASA
4	"Episode 4"	19-10-2019	ASD	5,4%
5	"Episode 5"	26-10-2019	ASD	ASA
6	"Episode 6"	02-11-2019	ASD	ASA
7	"Episode 7"	09-11-2019	ASD	ASA
8	"Episode 8"	16-11-2019	ASD	ASA
9	"Episode 9"	23-11-2019	ASD	ASA
