= Cinema of Angola =

Produced feature films
- Total: 50

The Cinema of Angola (Portuguese: Cinema de Angola) refers to the film industry and culture in the nation of Angola. During Portuguese colonization, popular films were imported from abroad, and movie theaters were popular social venues. In the late-colonial period and at the start of independence, Angola produced several independent films, such as Sambizanga, however during the civil war, film production became difficult. Angola currently suffers from financial issues around the funding of new films.

== History ==
=== Colonial Era ===
The first cinemas in Angola were built in the 1930s, with a total of 50 being built by the middle of the 1970s. Once community meeting points, many are now in a state of disrepair, but there is an effort to restore some of them.

During the late-colonial period, both Hollywood and European films were shown in popular Angolan movie theaters. Also shown at this time were films from Mexico, Hong Kong, and Brazil. It is reported that United States Western film and Asian kung fu film were particularly popular. Specifically, European films were most popular at theaters in mostly white neighborhoods, while Westerns and kung fu films were most popular in Black neighborhoods.

=== Post-Independence ===
In 1972, Angola became the first Lusophone African country to produce a feature-length film, with the movie Sambizanga.

After independence and during the Angolan Civil War, film production dropped due to the lack of non-Portuguese-supported film infrastructure, and the disruption caused by war.

=== Post-Civil War ===
As with many other post-colonial African countries, it is difficult for Angolans to secure funding and production infrastructure in their own country, and they must generally work internationally to make films for this reason.

In the early 2000s, the Angolan government helped fund a small number of films, however this programme stopped towards the end of the decade. During this time the film The Hero was filmed in Angola and won the World Dramatic Cinema Jury Grand Prize at the 2005 Sundance Film Festival.

In 2025, Angola premiered its first musical film, still one of the few to be shot in Africa. Called The Adventures of Angosat, it contains music composed by local rapper Isis Hembe.

== Themes ==
Many Angolan films have anti-colonial messaging, as film along with other art mediums was used to promote revolutionary ideas.

== See also ==
- List of Angolan films
