= Paixão =

Paixão may refer to:

- Paixão (TV series), a 2017–2018 Portuguese telenovela
- Paixão (film), a 2012 Portuguese film

== People with the given name ==
- Paixão Afonso (born 1991), Angolan Olympic sailor

== People with the surname ==
- Jorge Paixão (born 1965), Portuguese footballer and manager
- Bruno Paixão (born 1974), Portuguese football referee
- Fredson Paixão (born 1979), Brazilian martial artist
- Flávio Paixão (born 1984), Portuguese footballer
- Marco Paixão (born 1984), Portuguese footballer
- Liliana Paixão (born 1988), Angolan handball player
- Tainá Paixão (born 1991), Brazilian basketball player
- Luana Paixão (born 1993), Brazilian footballer
- Lucas Paixão (born 1994), Brazilian field hockey player
- Igor Paixão (born 2000), Brazilian footballer
