= Bruno de Almeida =

Portuguese filmmaker, musician, composer (born 1965)

Bruno De Almeida
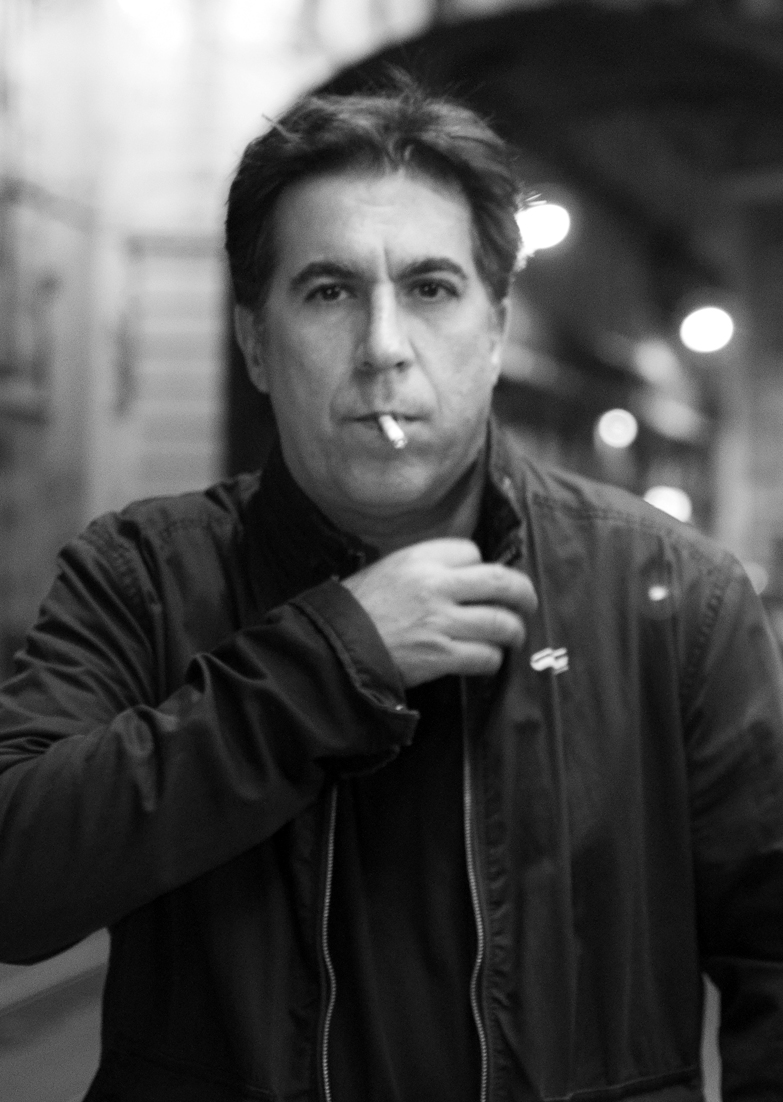
- Filmmaker Bruno de Almeida
- Born: Bruno de Almeida; 11 March 1965 (age 61); Paris, France
- Occupations: Director, screenwriter, producer, editor, musician, composer
- Years active: early 1980s-present

Bruno de Almeida (11 March 1965) is an independent filmmaker whose body of work navigates between fiction and documentaries. He is also a composer. He is New York City and Lisbon-based.

== Biography ==
Bruno de Almeida was born in Paris, of Portuguese origins. He has lived between New York City and Lisbon since 1985.

== Career ==
Bruno de Almeida started his artistic career as a musician in the New York downtown music scene in the mid-80s. He was a guitarist with Graham Haynes fusion band No Image playing in several clubs in New York City. Along with Mr. Haynes, he formed an experimental music duo playing in such places as The Knitting Factory and The Roulette. He played guitar with The Saheb Sarbib Quintet at the Brooklyn Museum of Art and had a Jazz duo with guitarist Sérgio Pelágio. Bruno de Almeida went on to compose music for film and dance pieces. He wrote music for choreographers Francisco Camacho, Vera Mantero, Paulo Ribeiro, among others.

In 1988, Bruno de Almeida joined Film/Video Arts in NYC, where he became a filmmaker, starting out as a cameraman and film editor. He photographed several shorts and music videos for other filmmakers, learning the technical craft hands-on. At Film/Video Arts, he made his first short film Anti-Glamour, a documentary about photographer Pepe Diniz.

Bruno de Almeida went on to open his production company Arco Films in 1990 as an outlet to produce his own films. His first directorial job was a video concert of the legendary singer Amália Rodrigues, "Amália Rodrigues, live in NYC" which was shot at NY's Town Hall. The video was distributed by EMI.

In 1992, Bruno de Almeida directed the film "The King in Exile" about the dance piece by choreographer Francisco Camacho, which played on television and Festivals worldwide. He has collaborated with Mr. Camacho since then.

Bruno de Almeida's first dramatic film, The Debt, starring Scott Renderer, Kristen Johnston and Paul Lazar, won the award for best short at the Cannes Film Festival Critic's Week in 1993 and had a long run playing in 85 film festivals. The film won another eight awards and was subsequently released theatrically ahead of features and broadcast in several countries.

In 1994, Bruno de Almeida made a five-hour television series about Amália Rodrigues called Amália, A Strange Way of Living which was broadcast on television in 1995. It was then released on a deluxe VHS set by EMI and is presently available on DVD.

Bruno de Almeida's feature debut On the Run starring Michael Imperioli, John Ventimiglia and written by Joe Minion (writer of After Hours) won the award for best film at the 1999 Ourense Film Festival in Spain. On the Run was nominated for a Critic's award at the Paris Film Festival and for the Open Palm Award at the Gotham Awards in New York in 2000. It was released theatrically and broadcast in Europe and in the US. It had its cable debut on The Independent Film Channel in 2001, and was released on DVD in 2002, becoming a cult classic.

His second feature was The Art of Amália, a documentary about Amália Rodrigues which was produced for American audiences. It was released theatrically and had a long run across the US in 2000. The film was broadcast in the US and Europe and was released on DVD in July 2004 by EMI. It went double platinum as the top-selling DVD in Portugal for four consecutive weeks. The film continues to play around the world, celebrating Amália Rodrigues' music.

Bruno's third feature, Candidate Vieira, was a documentary about the satirical Portuguese rock star Manuel João Vieira, who ran for president in 2001. It was released in the summer of 2005 on a double DVD along with a concert video of his band Ena Pá 2000.

Bruno de Almeida has also directed other projects that include documentaries, commercials, and music videos. From 1999 to 2004, he directed several projects for the Independent Film Channel. In 2005, Almeida created a film for Live/Evil - Evil/Live, a dance piece by choreographer Francisco Camacho which premiered at the International Dance Festival in Algarve and was shown at Lisbon's Culturgest. Almeida continued his collaboration with Mr. Camacho with the film for the dance piece RIP in 2010, also shown at Lisbon's Culturgest and other festivals. Bruno directed the music video "Sei de um Rio" for fado singer [Camané], in 2008 and in 2013, he directed Fado Celeste: Homenagem aos 90 anos a tribute to singer Celeste Rodrigues (Amália's sister) 90th birthday.

In 2005, he completed his fourth feature film, The Collection, a compilation of 24 short stories that were developed and created with a group of New York actors and writers over a four-year period. It was released on DVD in April 2006 by Midas Filmes.

In 2007, Bruno de Almeida's fifth feature The Lovebirds, starring Michael Imperioli, Drena De Niro, John Ventimiglia, Joaquim de Almeida, and Ana Padrão, won the Jury Prize at Fantasporto Film Festival director's week and at the Best director and screenplay awards of the Ourense International Film Festival. It had a successful theatrical run and DVD release in Portugal and played in film festivals worldwide.

His film 6=0 Homeostética, a feature documentary about the art group Homeostética, won a special mention award at the DocLisboa Festival in 2008. It was released in theaters, broadcast on television and released on DVD by Midas Filmes.

Bruno de Almeida's Bobby Cassidy: Counterpuncher, a feature documentary on the former professional boxer from Levittown, New York, was played at DocLisboa Festival and was released theatrically in 2009. The film was broadcast on television and released on DVD. Bruno also documented a series of retired fighters in After the Fight a documentary film still in progress.

Bruno created a multimedia installation called Esse Olhar Que Era Só Teu with guitarists Tó Trips and Pedro Gonçalves (from Dead Combo), which was exhibited at CCB/The Berardo Museum in Lisbon and later as a concert-film. Bruno made the film and played guitars and turntables. It premiered at the Vila do Conde Film Festival in 2010.

In 2012, he directed Operation Autumn, a political thriller about the 1965 killing of General Humberto Delgado by the Portuguese fascist police. With an ensemble cast that includes John Ventimiglia, Ana Padrão, Marcello Urgeghe, Nuno Lopes, among others, it went on to win several awards, including the SPA best actor award for Carlos Santos. The film was produced by Paulo Branco. It was released in theatres, broadcast on television, released on DVD, and shown in film festivals worldwide.

Bruno de Almeida was invited by Guimarães 2012, European Capital of Culture, to make a 30-minute film. The result was The Lecture starring John Frey and Ana Padrão, which was shown in Film Festivals, broadcast on television and released on DVD.

Bruno de Almeida's ninth feature Fado Camané, is a documentary about acclaimed fado singer Camané. It premiered at the DocLisboa Festival and went to a successful theatrical release in October 2014. It has played in film festivals worldwide and is considered one of the best fado documentaries to date.

In 2016, Bruno de Almeida directed Cabaret Maxime the story about a cabaret owner trying to keep his club from being taken over by the powers that be. Written by Bruno de Almeida and John Frey, the film stars Michael Imperioli, Ana Padrão, John Ventimiglia, David Proval, Nick Sandow, Mike Starr and Manuel João Vieira, among others. Cabaret Maxime was produced by Bruno de Almeida, Michael Imperioli and Jason Kliot. The film was released theatrically in Portugal in 2018 and in the US in 2020 and won several awards, including Best Feature Film and Best Actress (Ana Padrão) at SPA Authors Awards 2019. It is available on all digital platforms and on DVD.

Bruno de Almeida's first album Cinema Imaginado (Volume 1) came out in March 2022, on all digital platforms, CD, Cassette and Vinyl. Featuring extraordinary musicians like Graham Haynes on Cornet, Ricardo Toscano on Alto Sax, Mário Franco on bass and Frank London on trumpet, the album is a hybrid of acid jazz, spoken word, fusion, world music and alternative urban fusion. It was produced and distributed by BAMusic, Bruno's new record label. Bruno returns to music with a sonic and lyrical universe that recalls his best independent film work, where comedy and drama organically mix with decaying urban landscapes and offbeat characters.

Bruno's second album Cinema Imaginado (Volume 2) was released on digital platforms, CD and Cassette in January 2023, and once again features an eclectic group of world-class musicians such as Graham Haynes on cornet, Ricardo Toscano on sax and Mário Franco on bass. Continuing in the style of Volume 1, this album is a hybrid of acid jazz, fusion, fado, electronics and spoken word.

Bruno's third album Cinema Imaginado (Volume 3) once again featuring a great cast of musicians, including Graham Haynes, Ricardo Toscano, Mário Franco, Pedro Jóia, Mário Delgado, Óscar Graça, Gaspar Varela, José Salgueiro and others, is especially assembled to navigate a sonic landscape that seamlessly morph between funk, jazz, fado, flamenco and poetry. It came out on all digital platforms, CD and Cassette in 2024.

Bruno's new album Cinema Imaginado (Volume 4) was released on digital platforms, CD and Cassette in January 2026.

== Filmography ==
Year	Title
1990	Anti Glamour
1991	Amália Rodrigues, Live in NYC
1992	The King in Exile
1993	The Debt
1995	Amália - A Strange way of Living
1999	On the Run
1999	The Art of Amália
2003	Beyond Borders: John Sayles in Mexico
2004	Ena Pá 2000, 20 anos a pedalar na bosta
2004	O Candidato Vieira
2005	Live/Evil - Evil/Live
2005	The Collection
2007	The Lovebirds
2008	6=0 Homeostética
2009	Bobby Cassidy: Counterpuncher
2010	RIP
2012	Operation Autumn
2013	A Palestra
2014	Fado Camané
2016	Cabaret Maxime

== Discography ==
Year	Title
2022	Cinema Imaginado (Volume 1)
2023	Cinema Imaginado (Volume 2)
2024	Cinema Imaginado (Volume 3)
2024	Cinema Imaginado (Volume 4)
