= Boa Vista Creole =

Variant of Cape Verdean Creole

Boa Vista Creole is the name given to the variant of Cape Verdean Creole spoken mainly in the Boa Vista Island of Cape Verde. It belongs to the Barlavento Creoles branch. This form of Cape Verdean Creole was spoken by 5,000 ppl. (1.13% of the national population) in 2007 and is the least spoken form of Creole in the language. Literature is rarely recorded but one of the speakers who was born on the island is Germano Almeida.

As the island population doubled to over 8,000 in 2010, most of the population continue to speak the form of Cape Verdean Creole, some rarely speak the common Badiu by newcomers or both. Some immigrants abroad continue to speak the Creole form as a second language.

== Characteristics ==
Besides the main characteristics of Barlavento Creoles the Boa Vista Creole has also the following ones:

- The progressive aspect of the present is formed by putting tâ tâ before the verbs: tâ + tâ + V.
- In the verbs that end by ~a, that sound /ɐ/ is replaced by /ɔ/ when the verb is conjugated with the first person of the singular pronoun. Ex.: panhó-m’ /pɐˈɲɔm/ instead of panhâ-m’ /pɐˈɲɐm/ “to catch me”, levó-m’ /leˈvɔm/ instead of levâ-m’ /leˈvɐm/ “to take me”, coçó-m’ /koˈsɔm/ instead of coçâ-m’ /koˈsɐm/ “to scratch me”.
- The stressed e is always open /ɛ/. Ex.: bucé /buˈsɛ/ instead of bocê /boˈse/ “you (respectful form), drét’ /ˈdɾɛt/ instead of drêt’ /ˈdɾet/ “right”, tchobé /tʃoˈbɛ/ instead of tchovê /tʃoˈve/ “to rain”. The stressed o is always open /ɔ/. Ex.: bó /bɔ/ instead of bô /bo/ “you”, compó /kõˈpɔ/ instead of compô /kõˈpo/ “to fix”, tórrt’ /ˈtɔʀt/ instead of tôrt’ /ˈtoɾt/ “crooked”.
- The sound /ɾ/ at the end of syllables is pronounced /ʀ/. Ex.: furrtâ /fuʀˈtɐ/ instead of furtâ /fuɾˈtɐ/ “to steal”, m’djérr /ˈmdʒɛʀ/ instead of m’djêr /ˈmdʒeɾ/ “woman”, pórrt’ /ˈpɔʀt/ instead of pôrt’ /ˈpoɾt/ “harbor”.
- A /z/ originating from the junction of /l/ and /s/ is replaced by /ʀ/. Ex.: cárr /ˈkaʀ/ instead of cás /ˈkaz/ “which ones”, érr /ɛʀ/ instead of ês /ez/ “they”, quérr /kɛʀ/ instead of quês /kez/ “those”.
- A Portuguese /dʒ/ (written j in the beginning of words) is partially replaced by /ʒ/. Ex. jantâ /ʒɐ̃ˈtɐ/ instead of djantâ /dʒɐ̃ˈtɐ/ “to dine”, jôg’ /ˈʒoɡ/ instead of djôgu /ˈdʒoɡu/ “game”, but in words like djâ /dʒɐ/ “already” and Djõ /ˈdʒõ/ “John”, the sound /dʒ/ remains.
