= Ivo Canelas =

Portuguese actor (born 1973)

- Born: 23 December 1973 (age 52); Lisbon, Portugal
- Occupation: Actor
- Years active: 1991–present

Ivo Canelas (born 23 December 1973) is a Portuguese actor, born in Lisbon. With a career of more than 30 years, he is recognized for his participation in numerous film, theater and television productions.

He has a degree in Theater Studies from Escola Superior de Teatro e Cinema and studied at the Lee Strasberg Theater and Film Institute, in New York, with a scholarship from the Calouste Gulbenkian Foundation.

== Career ==
=== Cinema ===
He made his film debut in 1997 in the short film Menos Nove, directed by Rita Nunes. Soon after, in 1998, he participated in the short film It's Just a Minute directed by Pedro Caldas and written by Jacinto Lucas Pires.

In 2002 he joined the cast of The Uncertainty Principal by Manoel de Oliveira. In 2007 he won the Portuguese Golden Globe for Best Actor for the films O Mistério da Estrada de Sintra by Jorge Paixão da Costa and Call Girl by António-Pedro Vasconcelos.

In 2012 he played Apeles Espanca in the film Florbela directed by Vicente Alves do Ó and produced by Ukbar Filmes, a role that earned him the nomination for best actor in the first edition of the Sophia awards from the Portuguese Cinema Academy and the Best Actor CinEuphoria award. In the same year he joined the cast of A Estrada 47, a Brazilian, German, Italian and Portuguese co-production directed by Vicente Ferraz.

In 2015 he participates in the international production Powder and Gold directed by Felix Limardo and produced by William Fay. The following year he plays Lucas Mateus in Refrigerantes e Canções de Amor, a film written by Nuno Markl and directed by Luis Galvão Teles.

More recently, in 2022, he co-starred in the short film An Avocado Pit, w ritten and directed by Ary Zara, which was on the Oscar’s shortlist of 15 pre-nominated short films. A project with great international visibility, which received the support of actor Elliot Page's production company and was widely acclaimed by the trans community, all over the world.

=== Theater ===
In 1991 he made his debut at Teatro da Cornucópia in Amo-te by Almeno Gonçalves. Between 1993 and 1994 he was part of the group of actors of the Passage del Terror a very successful attraction at the Lisbon Amusement Park. In 1996 he joined the cast of Aqui Está Ela, by Nathalie Sarraute, directed by Diogo Dória.

In 1997 he began his work with Artistas Unidos, with Prometeu I, II, III by Jorge Silva Melo, with whom he returned to work the following year in O Fim ou Tende Misericórdia de Nós, then in Downfall of the Egotist Johann Fatzer by Bertolt Brecht, in 2000, O Navio dos Negros as the protagonist, in 2001, and Quartet by Heiner Müller, in 2016. Silva Melo becomes a decisive mentor in his career as an actor and will shape the way he practices his craft throughout his career.

In 1999 he joined the cast of Peaches a very successful comedy directed by José Wallenstein at Teatro Aberto. In 2000, he worked with director Solveig Nordlund in the show Night is Mother to the Day by Lars Noren and, in the same year, he participated in Boca Cheia de Pássaros, a dance theater show at Teatro Nacional D. Maria II, staged by Fernanda Lapa and Francisco Camacho.

In 2004 he participated in Capricho directed by Lúcia Sigalho. The following year he worked for the first time with director Tim Carroll in The Tempest at Teatro Nacional São Luiz. He returned to work with this director as the protagonist of Peter Shaffer's Amadeus, with Diogo Infante, at Teatro Nacional D. Maria II, a role for which he received the Portuguese Golden Globe for Best Theater Actor in 2011.

In 2014, he once again starred in the show Pedro Páramo by Juan Rulfo, directed by Miguel Seabra, at Teatro Meridional, which earned him a nomination for Best Theater Actor at the Portuguese Golden Globes.

Between 2018 and 2023 he stages and performs the monologue Every Brillian Thing by Duncan MacMillan, produced by Hugo Nóbrega from H2N, with scene and actors’ direction by Dora Bernardo. The show was a huge success, having toured the country for 4 years with more than 280 sold-out shows and around 30,000 spectators. This project earned him several awards, including the Solo Show Award by the 2020 Theater Guide, integrating the list of 30 best shows of 2019 by Comunidade Cultura e Arte and having won the 2021 Marketeer Award in the Art and Culture category.

=== Television ===
He became famous for his portrayal of Joca in the series O Fura Vidas (1999–2001). Between 2008 and 2011 he participated in the series Liberdade 21, produced by SP television and directed by Patrícia Sequeira and Sérgio Graciano. I n 2009 he joined the cast of the mini-series Conexão, directed by Leonel Vieira on RTP.

Between 2010 and 2012 he participated in the Canadian series Living in Your Car, directed by David Steinberg, among others. Soon after, he played the role of Xavier in the RTP series Os Filhos do Rock (2013–2014). In 2019 he joined the cast of Sul, an RTP series produced by Arquipélago Filmes and directed by Ivo Ferreira. In 2021 he plays the Minister of Defense in the Netflix series Glória, directed by Tiago Guedes.

Recently, in 2023 he joined the cast of the RTP series Emília, directed by Filipa Amaro. In 2024 he plays the role of Doctor in the RTP series O Americano directed by Ivo Ferreira. In 2025, he will participate in Projecto Global, a series by Ivo Ferreira about the FP25, and in Cold Haven, a Portuguese and Icelandic co-production, filmed in both countries.

== Selected filmography ==
=== Film ===
Year	Title	Director	Role	Notes
2022	An Avocado Pit	Ary Zara	Cláudio	Lead
2018	Soldado Millhões	Gonçalo Galvão Teles	Capitão Ribeiro de Carvalho	Supporting
2016	Refrigerantes e Canções de Amor	Luís Galvão Teles	Lucas Mateus	Lead
2016	Histórias de Alice	Oswaldo Caldeira	Miguel	Supporting
2015	Zeus	Paulo Filipe Monteiro		Supporting
2014	Powder and Gold	Felix Limardo	El Pavo Real	Supporting
2014	Papel de Natal	José Miguel Ribeiro	Sana	
2014	Gelo	Gonçalo Galvão Teles	Filipe	Supporting
2012	Florbela	Vicente Alves do Ó	Apeles Espanca	Lead
2012	A Estrada 47	Vicente Ferraz	Rui	Lead
2010	Shoot Me	André Badalo	Ruben	Lead
2010	So So	Sérgio Graciano		Lead
2010	Broken Clouds	Yuri Alves		Supporting
2010	A Bela e o Paparazzo	António-Pedro Vasconcelos	Médico	Cameo
2010	15 Pontos na Alma	Vicente Alves do Ó	Mário	Lead
2010	10-Gnosis	Leandro Ferrão		
2009	Desesavergonhadamente Real	Artur Serra Araújo		Lead
2008	Budapest	Walter Carvalho		Supporting
2008	The art of Stealing	Leonel Vieira	Xico da Silva	Lead
2007	Call Girl	António-Pedro Vasconcelos	Madeira	Lead
2007	Love Birds	Bruno de Almeida		Supporting
2007	Do Outro Lado do Mundo	Leandro Ferreira	Ricky	Supporting
2006	20, 13 Purgatório	Joaquim Leitão	Guerra	Supporting
2006	O Mistério da Estrada de Sintra	Jorge Paixão da Costa	Eça de Queirós	Lead
2006	Um Tiro no Escuro	Leonel Vieira		Lead
2005	Alice	Marco Martins		Supporting
2002	The Uncertainty Principle	Manoel de Oliveira		Supporting
2002	A Dupla Viagem	Teresa Garcia	Pedro	Supporting
2001	Olhó Passarinho	José Sacramento	João	Lead
2000	António Um Rapaz de Lisboa	Jorge Silva Melo	Jaime	Supporting
1999	Monsanto	Ruy Guerra	Bruno	Supporting
1998	Zona J	Leonel Vieira	Cosmo	Supporting
1998	É Só um Minuto	Pedro Caldas		Lead
1998	Entrada em Palco	Pedro Caldas	Himself	Supporting
1997	O Que Foi?	Ivo Ferreira		Supporting
1997	Menos 9	Rita Nunes	O Que Espera Na Estação	Lead

=== TV ===
Year	Title	Director	Role	Channel
2025	Cold Haven	Arnor Palmi e Tiago Marques	Alex	
2025	Projecto Global	Ivo Ferreira	Inspector Chefe	RTP1
2024	O Americano	Ivo Ferreira	Doutor	RTP1
2023	Emília	Filipa Amaro	Coreógrafo	RTP1
2022	Causa Própria	João Nuno Pinto	Procurador Vítor	RTP1
2022	Santiago	Pedro Varela	Pedro Vasconcellos	SIC
2021	Glória	Tiago Guedes	Ministro da Defesa	Netflix
2020	O Mundo Não Acaba Assim	Artur Ribeiro	Alberto	RTP1
2019	Sul	Ivo Ferreira	Pastor Santoro	RTP1
2018	Soldado Milhões	Gonçalo Galvão Teles e Jorge Paixão da Costa	Capitão Ribeiro de Carvalho	RTP1
2017	Into the Badlands		Baron Rojas	AMC
2017	Emerald City	Tarsem Singh	Javier	NBC
2017	Filha da Lei	Yuri Alves e Sérgio Graciano	Jaime	RTP1
2014	Mulheres de Abril	Joaquim Oliveira	Jorge	RTP1
2013	Os Filhos do Rock	Pedro Varela	Xavier Bastos	RTP1
2012	Perdidamente Florbela	Vicente Alves do Ó	Apeles Espanca	RTP1
2010	Living in Your Car	David Steinberg	Bruno	HBO
2010	O Segredo de Miguel Zuzarte	Henrique Oliveira	Miguel Zuzarte	
2010	Tempo Final	Pedro Varela	Óscar	RTP1
2009	Conexão	Leonel Vieira	Miguel Ângelo	RTP1
2008	Liberdade 21	Sérgio Graciano e Patrícia Sequeira	Afonso Ferraz	RTP1
2005	Jura	Paulo Sumion	Sebastião	SIC
2002	Olá Pai	António Moura Matos	Vasco Sarmento	TVI
1999	O Fura Vidas	Jorge Queiroga	Joca	SIC
1999	A Hora da Liberdade	Joana Pontes	Santos Silva	SIC
1998	Diário de Maria		Luís	RTP1
1998	Portugalmente			RTP1
1998	Débora	Jorge Cardoso	Manuel	RTP1
1997	Médico de Família	Miguel Queiroga	Hugo	SIC
1997	Riscos	Miguel Amaro da Costa, Santa Maria, António Correia		RTP1

=== Theatre ===
Year	Title	Play	Director	Theatre
2018/23	Every Brilliant Thing	Ducan MacMillan	Ivo Canelas	Sala Estúdio Time Out
2018	Creditors	Strindberg	Paulo Pinto	Teatro da Trindade
2016	Quartet	Heiner Müller	Jorge Silva Melo	Teatro Paulo Claro
2014	Pedro Páramo	Juan Rulfo	Miguel Seabra	Teatro Meridional
2011	Amadeus	Peter Shaffer	Tim Carroll	Teatro Nacional D. Maria II
2010	60 Durações de 1 Minuto		Clara Andermatt e Marco Martins	Teatro São Luiz
2005	The Tempest	W. Shakespeare	Tim Carroll	Teatro São Luiz
2004	Capricho		Lúcia Sigalho	
2003	Modigliani		Robert Castle	New York
2002	Fairy Tale		Megan Wallace	New York
2001	O Navio dos Negros		Jorge Silva Melo	Culturgest
2000	Boca Cheia de Pássaros		Fernanda Lapa e Francisco Camacho	Teatro Nacional D. Maria II
2000	Night is Mother to the Day	Lars Norén	Solveig Nordlund	C. C. Malaposta
2000	Downfall of the Egotistic Johann Fatzer	Bertolt Brecht	Jorge Silva Melo	Teatro Variedades
1999	Peaches	Nick Grosso	José Wallenstein	Teatro Aberto
1998	O Fim ou Tende Misericórdia de Nós		Jorge Silva Melo	Culturgest
1997	Prometeu I, II, III		Jorge Silva Melo	Teatro de Almada e Teatro da Trindade
1996	Aqui Está Ela	Nathalie Sarraute	Diogo Dória	Estrela 60
1995	O Grande Cerimonial	Fernando Arrabal	Paulo de Castro	CCB
1994	Bosque de Leite		Sandra Faleiro	Acarte
1993/94	Passage del Terror			Lisbon Amusement Park
1991	Amo-te	Abel Neves	Almeno Gonçalves	Teatro da Cornucópia

=== Awards ===
Year	Award	Category	Project	
2016	Sophia Awards - Portuguese Cinema Academy	Best Supporting Actor	Gelo	Nominated
2015	Golden Globe	Best Theatre Actor	Pedro Páramo	Nominated
2014	Lumen Award	Best Dramatic Fiction Actor		Winner
2013	Sophia Awards - Portuguese Cinema Academy	Best Actor	Florbela	Nominated
2013	Lux Magazine	Cinema Personality	Florbela and So So	Winner
2013	SPA - Sociedade Portuguesa de Autores	Best Series (collective award)	Perdidamente Florbela	Winner
2013	CinEuphoria	Best Actor	Florbela and So So	Winner
2012	Golden Globe	Best Theatre Actor	Amadeus	Winner
2010	Caminhos do Cinema Português Festival	Best Actor	Desavergonhadamente Real	Winner
2009	Ibero Brasil Festival	Best Actor	The art of Stealing	Winner
2009	49th Montecarlo TV Festival	Best Actor	Liberdade 21	Nominated
2009	GDA Award	Best Film Actor	Call Girl	Winner
2009	Golden Globe	Best Film Actor	The art of Stealing	Nominated
2008	Golden Globe	Best Film Actor	Mistério da Estrada de Sintra and Call Girl	Winner
2008	36th Gramado Film Festival	Best Actor in Foreign Film	Mistério da Estrada de Sintra	Nominated
1999	Ribeiro da Fonte	New Talent		Winner
1999	Badajoz Short Films Festival	Special Mention	Olhó Passarinho	Winner
