= Dalila Carmo =

Portuguese actress

- Born: 24 August 1974 (age 51); Vila Nova de Gaia, Portugal

Dalila Carmo (born 24 August 1974) is a Portuguese actress.

She trained at The Actors Studio in New York in 1996-1997 with Marcia Haufrecht, who directed her in Vidas Publicadas by Donald Margulies, Teatro da Comuna (2005), A Lição de Ionesco (1996), and Ludlow Fair by Lansford Wilson (1997) at The Common Basis Theatre.

She was a cast member in numerous productions such as Artaud Estudio with Paulo Filipe (ACARTE, 1997); Auto da India by Gil Vicente; Let's Make Opera with Paulo Matos (Teatro São Luiz, 1994); Queima de Judas (Teatro O Bando, 1992).

In the movie industry, after appearing in Paulo Castro's short film, O Criado Ostrowski (1990), she played in Vale Abraão (1993) by Manoel de Oliveira.

In between TV movies and some international co-productions, she also performed in features such as A Comédia de Deus (1995) by João Cesar Monteiro, Tráfico (1998) by João Botelho, O Anjo da Guarda (1999) by Margarida Gil, and Os Meus Espelhos (2005) by Rui Simões, "Quero Ser Uma Estrela" (2009) by José Carlos de Oliveira, "Quinze Pontos na Alma" (2009) and Florbela (2011) by Vicente Alves do Ó.

She acted at the Theatre Company of Almada, under the direction of Joaquin Benite, in Molière by Mikhail Bulgakov (1995) and Filopópulus by Virgílio Martinho (1995).

Dalila Carmo was a cast member of nearly 10 soap operas: 2006 - Tempo de Viver, 2005 - Ninguem Como Tu, 2003 - Morangos com Açúcar, 2002 - Jóia de África, 2001 - Filha do Mar, 2000 - Jardins Proibidos, 1999 - Todo o Tempo do Mundo, 1998 - Diário de Maria, among others.

Dalila is currently living between Lisbon and Madrid.

== Filmography ==
- God's Comedy (1995)
- Traffic (1998)
- O Anjo da Guarda (1999)
- Os Meus Espelhos (2005)
- Quero Ser Uma Estrela (2009)
- Quinze Pontos na Alma (2009)
- Florbela (2012)
- Sinais de Vida (2013)
- Os Filhos do Rock (2014)
- O Beijo do Escorpião (2014)
- A Impostora (2016–17)
- Jacinta (2017)
- Pôr do Sol (2022)
