= Sinais de Vida =

Television series

- Developed by: SP Televisão
- Starring: Dalila Carmo; Joaquim Horta; São José Correia; Rosa do Canto; Álvaro Faria; Maria Carolina Pacheco; Francisco Ferreira
- Country of origin: Portugal
- Original language: Portuguese
- No. of seasons: 1
- No. of episodes: 80

Original release
- Network: RTP1
- Release: January 14, 2013 – present

Sinais de Vida is a Portuguese medical drama television series broadcast by RTP. It has 80 episodes and started airing on 14 January 2013 on RTP1.

== Cast ==
- Dalila Carmo
- Joaquim Horta
- São José Correia
- Rosa do Canto
- Álvaro Faria
- Maria Carolina Pacheco
- Francisco Ferreira
