= Os Filhos do Rock =

Portuguese television series

- Created by: Pedro Varela
- Developed by: Stopline Filmes
- Written by: Pedro Varela
- Directed by: Pedro Varela
- Starring: Albano Jerónimo; Ivo Canelas; Isabel Abreu
- Country of origin: Portugal
- Original language: Portuguese
- No. of seasons: 1
- No. of episodes: 26

Original release
- Network: RTP1
- Release: December 8, 2013 – June 7, 2014

Os Filhos do Rock is a Portuguese television series broadcast by RTP and set in the Portuguese rock scene of the 1980s. It has 26 episodes and aired from 8 December 2013 to 7 June 2014 on RTP1.

== Cast ==
- Albano Jerónimo
- Ivo Canelas
- Isabel Abreu
- Filipa Areosa
