= Road 47 =

2013 film directed by Vicente Ferraz

- Theatrical release poster
- Directed by: Vicente Ferraz
- Screenplay by: Vicente Ferraz
- Produced by: Isabel Martinez; Matias Mariani; Joana Mariani; Danielle Mazzocca; Leonel Vieira
- Starring: Daniel de Oliveira; Richard Sammel; Sergio Rubini; Julio Andrade; Giorgio Vicenzotti
- Cinematography: Carlos Arango De Montis
- Edited by: Mair Tavares
- Music by: Luiz Avellar
- Production companies: Primo Filmes; Stopline Films; Três Mundos Produções; Verdeoro
- Distributed by: Europa Filmes (Brazil)
- Release date: October 4, 2013 (Festival do Rio)
- Running time: 107 minutes
- Countries: Brazil; Portugal; Italy
- Languages: Portuguese; Italian; German

Road 47 (Portuguese: A Estrada 47) is a 2013 historical war drama film written and directed by Vicente Ferraz, based on real events, about Brazil's involvement in World War II. The film stars Daniel de Oliveira, Richard Sammel, Sergio Rubini and Julio Andrade.

The film follows the trajectory of men from the landmine clearance unit of the Brazilian Expeditionary Force who after a panic attack are trying to get tempers and defuse the mined road that separates them from a village monitored by enemy forces.

== Plot ==
=== Background ===
During World War II, Brazil became an ally of Soviet Union, United States, UK and Free France, among other Allies. In the second half of 1944, it sent to the Italian Campaign, in several stages, a military contingent formed mainly by an infantry division to fight the forces of Nazi Germany and Fascist Italy. Almost all these soldiers came from rural and poor backgrounds, and with no previous military experience, they had to learn in practice to fight for survival at the front.

=== Main plot ===
After suffering a collective panic in a non-specified point of Gothic Line, the soldiers Guimarães (Daniel de Oliveira), Piauí (Gaspar Francisco), Laurindo (Thogum) and their Lieutenant (Júlio Andrade), try to retreat of the site, but end up missing their company. So, they had to decide to return to their unit under risk of facing court-martial for dereliction of duty, or return to the position of night before at risk of facing a surprise attack by numerous forces of the enemy. That's when a war correspondent, Rui (Ivo Canelas), tells them about an active minefield and they think this is a chance to redeem the mistake they committed, but much is yet to happen and the war is far from over.

== Cast ==
- Sergio Rubini as Giovanni
- Daniel de Oliveira as Guimarães "Guima"
- Thogun as Sergente Laurindo
- Francisco Gaspar as Piauí
- Júlio Andrade as Tenente Penha
- Ivo Canelas as Rui
- Richard Sammel as Hauptmann Jurgen Mayer
- Daniele Grassetti as Partigiano
- Giorgio Vicenzotti as Partigiano

== Production ==
In an interview, Vicente Ferraz said that he wanted to discuss Brazil's history in World War II, which he said was "forgotten by the Brazilians and which is completely unknown abroad." He used diaries, letters, and interviews as source material.

== Release ==
Road 47 premiered at the 2013 Festival do Rio.

== Reception ==
Jonathan Holland of The Hollywood Reporter wrote, "Competent but not inspiring, this is a simple and effective film which never does full justice to the stirring material it’s based on." Mark Adams of Screen International called it an "impressively mounted war film" and "high quality drama".
