= O dia das calças roladas =

1982 novel by Germano Almeida

- 1999 paperback edition
- Author: Germano Almeida
- Language: Portuguese
- Publisher: Ilhéu Editora
- Publication date: 1982
- Publication place: Cape Verde
- English publication date: 2004
- Media type: Print
- Followed by: The Last Will and Testament of Senhor da Silva Araújo

O dia das calças roladas is a Capeverdean novel published in 1982 by Germano Almeida.

The book was first published on Ilhéu Editora. The story is about an account of a strike that happened on the island of Santo Antão.
