= Arronches =

- Municipality
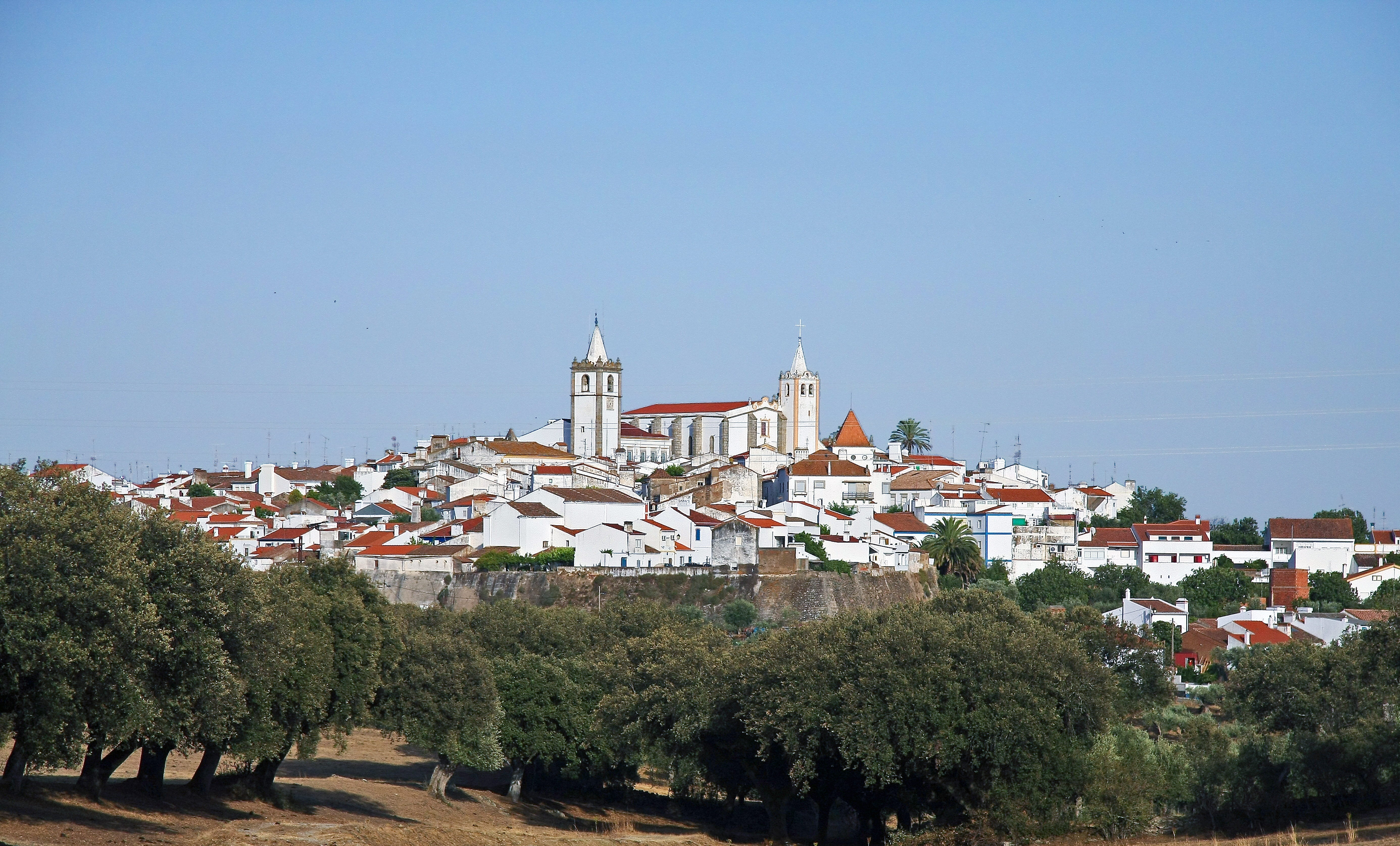

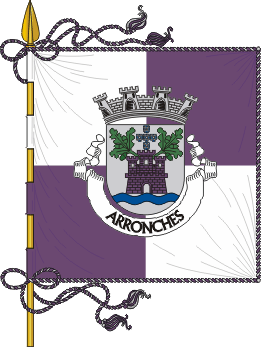
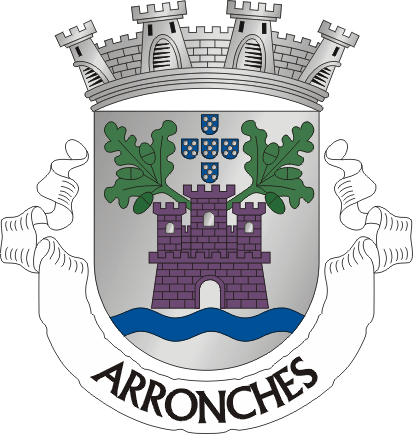
- Flag Coat of arms
- Interactive map of Arronches
- Location in Portugal
- Coordinates: 39°07′N 7°17′W
- Country: Portugal
- Region: Alentejo
- Intermunic. comm.: Alto Alentejo
- District: Portalegre
- Parishes: 3

Government
  - President: Fermelinda Carvalho (PSD)

Area
  - Total: 314.65 km^{2} (121.49 sq mi)

Population (2011)
  - Total: 3,165
  - Density: 10.06/km^{2} (26.05/sq mi)
- Time zone: UTC+00:00 (WET)
  - Summer (DST): UTC+01:00 (WEST)
- Local holiday: John the Baptist; June 24
- Website: www.cm-arronches.pt/en/

Arronches (Portuguese pronunciation: [ɐˈʁõʃɨʃ]) is a municipality in Portugal. The population in 2011 was 3,165, in an area of 314.65 km^{2}.

The municipality is located by the Serra de São Mamede in Portalegre District.

The present Mayor is Fermelinda Carvalho (PSD) and the President of the Municipal Assembly is Abílio Panasco (PSD). The municipal holiday is June 24, after Saint John the Baptist.

== Parishes ==
Administratively, the municipality is divided into 3 civil parishes (freguesias):

- Assunção
- Esperança
- Mosteiros

== Notable people ==
- Isabel Abreu (born 1978) a Portuguese actress.
