= The Art of Amália =

2000 USA-Portugal documentary film

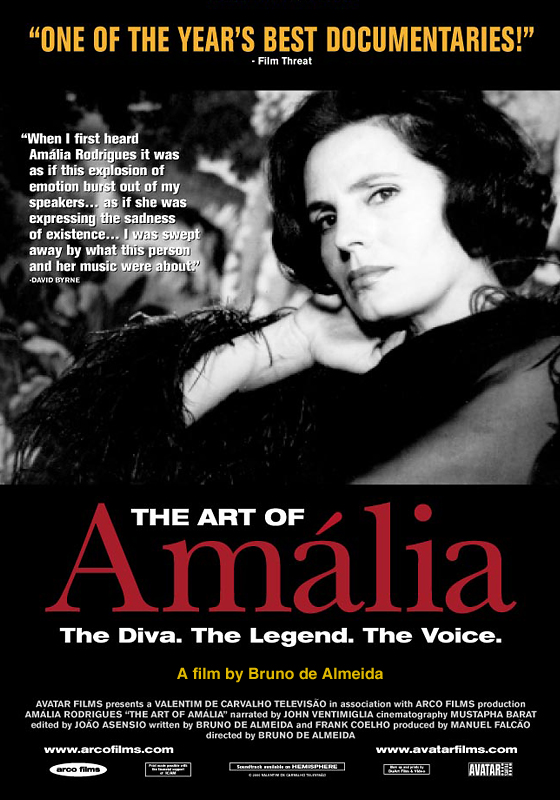
- Directed by: Bruno de Almeida
- Starring: Amália Rodrigues
- Cinematography: Mustapha Barrat
- Edited by: João Asensio
- Release date: 2000
- Running time: 90 minutes
- Countries: Portugal, United States
- Language: English

The Art of Amália is a documentary by Bruno de Almeida on the artistic career of Amália Rodrigues (1920–1999), the celebrated Fado singer from Portugal. The 90-minute film is based on a previous five-hour made-for-television mini-series on the singer that dealt with her life and career; it was also de Almeida’s fourth cinematic project celebrating Rodrigues’ career.

The film opens with an on-screen introduction by David Byrne, who praises the singer for “singing in these fado songs about the sadness of the universe, not only about a personal sadness or a tragedy in her own life or in the writer's life, but she was expressing the sadness of existence." The Art of Amália mixes rare film, television and concert footage from different periods of Rodrigues’ career. The film also presents a previously thought lost clip of a rare appearance (billed only as “Amália”) on U.S. television in 1953, where she performed her hit song "Coimbra" (better known to U.S. audiences in the English-language version "April in Portugal").

The Art of Amália also includes the last filmed interview by Rodrigues, who died one week before production was completed.

The film had its U.S. premiere in March 2000 at a United Nations benefit, and its theatrical premiere in New York in December 2000. A DVD was released 2004.
