= Em Câmara Lenta =

- Directed by: Fernando Lopes
- Screenplay by: Rui Cardoso Martins
- Based on: Em câmara lenta by Pedro Reis
- Produced by: Paulo Branco
- Starring: Rui Morrison; João Reis; Maria João Bastos; Maria João Luís
- Cinematography: Edmundo Díaz
- Release date: March 8, 2012 (Portugal)
- Running time: 71 minutes
- Country: Portugal
- Language: Portuguese

Em Câmara Lenta is a 2012 Portuguese film directed by Fernando Lopes.

== Cast ==
- Rui Morrison
- João Reis
- Maria João Bastos
- Maria João Luís
