= O Beijo do Escorpião =

Portuguese telenovela

- "2014, the year of passion"
- Genre: Romance, Melodrama, Revenge
- Created by: Artur Ribeiro
- Developed by: Plural Entertainment
- Directed by: Hugo de Sousa
- Starring: Sara Matos; Dalila Carmo; Pedro Lima; Pedro Teixeira (see more)
- Opening theme: Cedo o Meu Lugar by Mesa
- Ending theme: Cedo o Meu Lugar by Mesa
- Country of origin: Portugal
- Original language: Portuguese
- No. of episodes: 194

Production
- Running time: 50min

Original release
- Network: TVI
- Release: 2 February – 4 October 2014

Related
- Destinos Cruzados; A Única Mulher

O Beijo do Escorpião (English: The Kiss of the Scorpion) is a Portuguese telenovela broadcast and produced by TVI. It was written by António Barreira, author of some of the biggest hits of the channel, and by João Matos. The telenovela premiered on 2 February 2014 and its last episode aired on 4 October 2014, totaling a number of 194 episodes. It was broadcast in the primetime slot at 9pm (UTC). The telenovela was recorded in Lisbon, Portugal.

== Cast ==
=== Main ===
- Sara Matos – Alice Vidal
- Dalila Carmo – Rita Macieira
- Pedro Lima – Fernando Macieira
- Pedro Teixeira – Rafael Pires – «Rafa»

=== Secondary ===
- Natália Luiza – Adelaide Maria Correia Vidal
- Nuno Homem de Sá – António Furtado
- Ana Brito e Cunha – Alexandra Furtado – «Xana»
- Marco Delgado – Romão Valente de Albuquerque
- Sandra Faleiro – Natália de Albuquerque
- Maria José Paschoal – Conceição Pires
- Joana Seixas – Teresa Furtado
- Rui Luís Brás – Marco Santos
- Sofia Nicholson – Ana Santos
- Paula Neves – Vera Ramos
- Alberto Magassela - Rafael's cellmate
- Rodrigo Menezes – Nuno Ramos
- Dinarte Branco – Hilário Castelo
- Pedro Carvalho – Paulo Furtado from Macieira
- Patricia André – Isabel de Albuquerque – «Becas»
- Renato Godinho – Manuel Ventura
- Duarte Gomes – Miguel Macieira
- Madalena Brandão – Marta Ventura
- Isaac Alfaiate – Ricardo de Albuquerque
- Joana Câncio – Tina Castelo
- Rodrigo Paganelli – André Macieira
- Mikaela Lupu – Maria Santos
- Gonçalo Sá – Frederico Santos
- Mafalda Tavares – Carlota Furtado
- Luís Ganito – Duarte Macieira
- Nicolau Breyner – Henrique de Albuquerque
- Lídia Franco – Madalena de Albuquerque
- Margarida Marinho – Rosalinda Castelo
- Diogo Infante – Afonso Gonçalves

=== Children ===
- Daniela Marques – Beatriz Ventura
- Francisco Magalhães – Martim Ramos
