= Veredas =

- Directed by: João César Monteiro
- Produced by: Henrique Espírito Santo
- Cinematography: Acácio de Almeida
- Release date: 1978
- Running time: 116 minutes
- Country: Portugal
- Language: Portuguese

Trails or Paths (Portuguese: Veredas) is a 1978 Portuguese art film directed by João César Monteiro in his debut feature.

== Synopsis ==
"History of the Branca-Flor" from legends and figures of popular mythology. Roots of an itinerary through the natural and landscape origins, to the heart of Portugal. The values (water, birth, life-wheel), the figures (the devil, the wolves) and the references (the lord, servitude), with a stigma of unavoidable justice".

== Cast ==
- Manuela de Freitas
- Luís de Sousa Costa
- Francisco Domingues
- Carmen Duarte
- Margarida Gil
- António Mendes
