= Estórias contadas =

Cape Verdean book

O dia das calças roladas
- Author: Germano Almeida
- Language: Portuguese
- Publication date: 1998
- Publication place: Cape Verde
- Media type: Print
- Pages: 126
- ISBN: 972-211220-1

Estórias contadas is a collection of 55 crônicas by Capeverdean writer Germano Almeida, published in book form in 1998.

The crônicas were originally published in the Portuguese newspaper Público.
