= A Moral Conjugal =

2012 Portuguese Drama film

- Film poster
- Directed by: Artur Serra Araújo
- Starring: Dinarte Branco; São José Correia; José Wallenstein; Catarina Wallenstein; Maria João Bastos
- Distributed by: Zon Audiovisuais
- Release date: November 1, 2012
- Running time: 95 minutes
- Country: Portugal
- Language: Portuguese

A Moral Conjugal is a 2012 Portuguese drama film directed by Artur Serra Araújo and starring Dinarte Branco, São José Correia and José Wallenstein.

== Cast ==
- Dinarte Branco
- São José Correia
- José Wallenstein
- Catarina Wallenstein
- Maria João Bastos

== Reception ==
=== Critical response ===
Jorge Mourinha, on Público, gave the film a rating of one out of five stars.

=== Accolades ===
Award	Date	Category	Recipients and nominees	Result
Sophia Awards	October 6, 2013	Best Supporting Actress	Maria João Bastos	Nominated
Sophia Awards	October 6, 2013	Best Sound	Quintino Bastos and Vasco Carvalho	Nominated
