= Ana Firmino =

Cape Verdean singer

Ana Firmino (born 1953) is a Cape Verdean singer. She was born in 1953 on the island of Sal, but it was not until she was in her late 20s that she dedicated herself to a career in music. She has performed for many years in Cape Verde and Europe particularly in Portugal, appearing in film and on television releasing several solo albums including Amor e Tao Sabe (1998). She is a well-regarded interpreter of the native morna as well as other traditional genres. One of her signature songs is Chico Malandro, produced by one of Cape Verde's most successful musicians Tito Paris.

Her two film credits are Fintar o Destino (1998) (released as Dribbling Fate in the USA) and Testamento do Senhor Napumoceno (English: Napumoceno's Will) (1997).

Together with Tito Paris, they appeared at the Portimão Music Festival in Portugal in 2010

== Personal life ==
Ana married a painter António N. Firmino and later gave birth at the age of 19 to Ángelo César do Rosário Firmino, a rapper who now lives in Portugal and is known by the stage name Boss AC, she later had a few more children. Both Ana and her family would immigrate to Lisbon, Portugal in the 1990s.

== Discography ==
Source: Ana Firmino's blog page (in Portuguese)

- Carta De Nha Cretcheu (Associação De Amizade Portugal - Cabo Verde, 1989)
- Amor É Tão Sabe (Africana/VC, 1998)
- Viva Vida (2003)

=== Singles ===
- "Feiticeira di côr Morena", LP, originally by Travadinha.
- Tunga Tunginha" with Boss AC in the album Manda Chuva (1998)
