= Mário Franco =

Portuguese musician and dancer

Mário Franco (born 20 October 1965 in Lisbon) is a Portuguese dancer, double bass player and a composer.

== Studies ==
Mário Franco started music lessons at the age of 4 in Centro de Estudos Gregorianos and continued his studies in Academia de Amadores de Música, and where he started double bass lessons with Fernando Flores, and composition with Pedro Rocha as well as studying chamber music.

He studied bass guitar with António Ferro, Double Bass with David Gausden in Escola de Jazz do Hot Clube de Portugal; and took part in workshops with Rufus Reid, Niels Henning Orsted Pederson, and Eberhard Weber.

In 1986-87, he attended double-bass courses given by Ludwig Streicher in Estoril and in 1988 won 1st prize in the Prémio Jovens Musicos (Young Musicians Competition); later, he became a member of Orquestra Sinfonica Juvenil where he worked on classical repertory with conductor Christopher Bochmann.

== Performing ==
Since 1984, he has played jazz and improvised music in Portugal and abroad with musicians such as António Pinho Vargas, Mário Laginha, João Paulo Esteves de Silva, Bernardo Sassetti, Carlos Martins, Tomás Pimentel, José Peixoto, Jarmo Savolainen, Jim Leff, Ralph Peterson Jr., Paolo Fresu, Andy Sheppard, Peter Epstein and Ralph Towner.

In 1990, he presented his first project based on original compositions and was awarded 1st prize for his group and 2nd prize for composition in the competition “A Juventude e a Musica” (Young People and Music).

He has performed outside Portugal: in Macau, Japan, Spain, France, Belgium and Norway and has participated in some of Portugal's music festivals such as:

- Festival de Música dos Capuchos 1985; Jazz na Cidade 88, 90; Lisboa em Jazz 90;
- 5 ª Jornadas Internacionais da Oficina Musical 90; Encontros de Jazz do Algarve 91;
- 16º Encounters Gulbenkian of Contemporary Music 92 (Gulbenkian Foundation);
- Jazz no Parque, 3ª edition (Serralves Foundation) 95; Festas de Lisboa 95, 96;
- Festa do Avante 90, 94, 96; Seixal Jazz Festival 98, 05;
- Festival Internacional de Jazz de Faro in 99 “Jazz no Inverno”; Musicalidades 01;
- Jazz em Agosto (Gulbenkian Foundation) 87, 88, 90, 95 and 05;
- Maio Jazz Almodôvar 05, 07; 4ª Festa do Jazz 06; Festival de Jazz de Estremoz 06, 08; International Film Festival IndieLisboa 07; 10º Festival de Valado de Frades 07;
- 11º Matosinhos em Jazz 07; 1º Festival de Jazz de Sines 07; Festival Y#5, 07;
- 1º Ciclo de concertos “ O Som das Musas” Vila Flôr 07; 2º Festival Internacional de Palmela 07; Mudas Jazz Sessions (Madeira) 08; 1ª Feira de Artes Performativas de Tavira’08; *Portugal Jazz 07, 09; Festival Internacional de Música dos Açores 09; 6º Festival Terras sem Sombra

== Composing and dancing ==
Also composes for Dance and Theatre. is also a dancer from the National Ballet Company of Portugal (CNB) since 1986.

== Recordings ==
As a Side Musician: (Selected CDs): António Pinho Vargas Quintet and Carlos Martins Quartet: Lisboa em Jazz (CML Pelouro Cultura, 1991); João Paulo Esteves da Silva Quartet: Serra sem Fim (Farol Música, 1993); Tomás Pimentel Septet: Descolagem (El Tatu, 1994); Luz Destino (M.A Recordings, 1996); José Peixoto: O Que Me Diz o Espelho d’água (Farol Música, 2000);José Peixoto: A Tempo (A Capella, 2001); José Peixoto: Aceno, featuring Ralph Towner (Zona Música, 2003).

As a Leader: ”This Life” Mario Franco Quintet with David Binney (Tone of a Pitch Records, 2006)
