= Florbela =

- Directed by: Vicente Alves do Ó
- Starring: Dalila Carmo; Albano Jerónimo; Ivo Canelas
- Production company: Ukbar Filmes
- Release date: March 8, 2012 (Portugal)
- Country: Portugal
- Language: Portuguese
- Box office: €174,543.51

Florbela is a 2012 Portuguese biographical film about Portuguese poet Florbela Espanca, directed by Vicente Alves do Ó.

== Cast ==
- Dalila Carmo as Florbela Espanca
- Albano Jerónimo
- Ivo Canelas
