= Margarida Gil =

Portuguese film director and actor (born 1950)

Maria Margarida Gil Lopes
- Born: 7 September 1950 (age 75); Covilhã, Portugal
- Education: University of Lisbon
- Occupation: Film director • actress • sculptor
- Years active: 1986 to present

Maria Margarida Gil Lopes (born 1950) is a Portuguese filmmaker, teacher and artist. She has been president of the Association of Portuguese Directors. She collaborated with and was married to the director, actor and film critic João César Monteiro.

== Early life ==
Margarida Gil was born on 7 September 1950 in Covilhã, a city in the centre of Portugal, where she went to high school. In 1968, at the age of 17, she and her family moved to the Portuguese capital of Lisbon, where she attended the Faculty of Arts of the University of Lisbon at the same time as supporting herself by working at the Santa Casa da Misericórdia de Lisboa. She graduated in Germanic Philology, although her earlier plans were to study fine arts and become a painter.

Gil began to attend sessions that the Cinemateca Portuguesa promoted, and during the showing of a cycle of films of the German director F. W. Murnau, she met João César Monteiro, who was finishing the filming of his short film Quem Espera por Sapatos de Defunto Morre Descalço (Who Waits for the Dead Man's Shoes Dies Barefoot). Through this connection to Monteiro, she became close to many Portuguese film directors, meeting many of the leading lights at the time, such as António-Pedro Vasconcelos, Jorge Silva Melo, Solveig Nordlund, Alberto Seixas Santos, Paulo Rocha, and Fernando Lopes. Monteiro asked her to be the assistant director on his next film, Fragmentos de um Filme-Esmola: A Sagrada Família, shot in 1972 and 1973.

== Career ==
After the 1974 Carnation Revolution she got a job at Emissora Nacional, working on radio news programmes. In 1975 she returned to work with Monteiro in Que Farei com Esta Espada? (What will I do with this sword?), as an assistant director and actress. In 1976 she participated in the creation of Grupo Zero, a film production cooperative, with Seixas Santos, Nordlund, Monteiro, Melo, Acácio de Almeida, and others. In the same year she joined Radio Televisão Portuguesa (RTP), the renamed Emissora Nacional, directing several documentaries. Her work included Clínica Comunal Popular da Cova da Piedade, about an old building occupied by the people and then transformed into a clinic that would provide the first serious family planning in the area. It would be awarded a prize at Dok Leipzig, the Leipzig Film Festival. In 1978 she began to direct shows on RTP2.

In parallel, she continued her film career with Monteiro, by then her husband, working on his films, Veredas, as an assistant director and actress, O Amor das Três Romãs, as an actress, and Silvestre, as assistant director. In 1986, she was the executive producer of À Flor do Mar, produced by Monteiro & Gil, the production company they formed, which also produced her first feature-length work as a film director, Recção Fiel e Verdadeira (Faithful and True Relationship), shot in 1986, which was presented at the Venice Film Festival in 1987 but not shown in Portugal until 1989.

Soon afterwards, she made the television film Flores Amargas, which looked at Timorese refugees housed near Lisbon. Other television films included several experimental films based on the life and work of the Portuguese poet and writer, Fernando Pessoa. In 1992, she made her second feature film, Rosa Negra (Black Rose), which was shown at the Locarno Film Festival but never had a commercial premiere. Subsequently, Gil made several video documentaries, notably Maria, for the World Conference on Women, 1995, which took place in Beijing, and As Chosen, about the life and work of the painter Graça Morais. In 1998, she made O Anjo da Guarda (The Guardian Angel), which received an award at the Rome Film Festival and the Figueira da Foz Film Festival. She then left RTP and began teaching and research at the Faculty of Social and Human Sciences of NOVA University Lisbon. In 2003, she acted in Monteiro's last film Vai e Vem. Monteiro died in 2003. He had dedicated his 1998 film, As Bodas de Deus, to Gil.

In 2012, she released the film, Paixão. In February 2024, her film Mãos no Fogo (Hands in the Fire), a film loosely inspired by the horror novella The Turn of the Screw by Henry James, was shown at the 74th Berlin International Film Festival.

== Artistic work ==
After 2000, while continuing to make films, Gil returned to her early love of painting, drawing and sculpture. An exhibition of her ceramic sculptures was held in Cascais in 2024.

== Awards and nominations ==
In 2005, Gil was awarded the Lifetime Career Award at the Rome Film Festival. In the same year she won the Feature Film Grand Prix at IndieLisboa for the film Adriana, which was also nominated for the 2006 Portugal Golden Globes, with Ana Moreira receiving the Best Actress award for her role in the film. In 2012, the Escola Superior Artística do Porto (ESAP) awarded Gil the Aurélio Paz do Reis Prize, in recognition of her cinematographic career.

== Films ==
Gil's films include:

- 1975 - Clínica Comunal Popular de Cova da Piedad (Documentary)
- 1976 - Para todo o serviço (Documentary)
- 1982 - Olho de Vidro: Uma História da Fotografia (Documentary)
- 1987 - Relação Fiel e Verdadeira
- 1988 - Flores Amargas
- 1991 - Daisy, um Filme para Fernando Pesso
- 1992 - Rosa Negra
- 1994 - A Luz Incerta
- 1997 - As escolhidas (Documentary)
- 1999 - O Anjo da Guarda
- 2002 - Não me Cortes o Cabelo que Meu Pai me Penteou (Short)
- 2005 - Adriana
- 2007 - Sobre o Lado Esquerdo (Short)
- 2007 - LuzLinar e o Louva-a-Deus (Documentary)
- 2009 - Fátima de A a Z (Documentary)
- 2010 - Perdida Mente
- 2010 - Conversas no Cabeleireiro, (with Solveig Nordlund)
- 2012 - O Fantasma do Novais
- 2012 - Paixão
- 2012 - A Esquina do Tempo (Short)
- 2017 - A que chamas pensar?
- 2018 - Mar
- 2024 - Mãos no Fogo
