= The Last Will and Testament of Senhor da Silva Araújo =

- Author: Germano Almeida
- Original title: O Testamento do Senhor Napumoceno da Silva Araújo
- Translator: New Directions
- Language: Portuguese
- Publisher: Ilhéu Editora
- Publication date: 1989
- Publication place: Cape Verde
- English publication date: 2004
- Media type: Print
- ISBN: 972-21-0575-2
- Preceded by: O dia das calças roladas
- Followed by: My Poet (O meu poeta)

The Last Will and Testament of Senhor da Silva Araújo (Portuguese: O Testamento do Senhor Napumoceno da Silva Araújo, Cape Verdean Creole (Badiu): U Testamentu du Sinhor Napumosenu da Silva Araúju) is a Capeverdean novel published in the Portuguese language in 1989 by Germano Almeida. It mixes humor with cruel realism, sometimes pathetic, in a modern writing favoring the free indirect style. The novel was adapted into a movie titled Napomuceno's Will in 1997 and was directed by Francisco Manso and starring Ana Firmino.

The book was first published on Ilhéu Editora. Its first translation was in French and translated by Édouard Bailby by Éditions Sepia in 1995, it was later published in an English translation in 2004 by New Directions Publishing as The Last Will and Testament of Senhor da Silva Araújo.

== Plot ==
The death of Senhor Napumoceno da da Silva Araújo, an illustrious merchant from Mindelo, the opening of the testament shows in surprises. More than a will, it is 387 pages of memoirs, which shows the dead man's face, the vicissitudes of the dissolved life, has his secret daughter and its hatred of his nephew Carlos that deprived its expected heritage.

== Characters ==
- Napumoceno da Silva Araújo - protagonist with a double life and dubious conduct, tries to maintain a good image. He is a poor Cape Verdean from S. Nicolau who will become an important and rich merchant in Mindelo. He owns an import-export company called Araújo Lda. He was a councilor in the municipality of São Vicente .
- Carlos - Napumoceno's nephew originally from S. Nicolau . Despite being the only legitimate heir, he is disinherited by Napumoceno due to an unexpected situation.
- Maria da Graça - Napumoceno's daughter with the cleaning lady Maria Chica. She is the heiress of Napumoceno, having been created without knowing it.
- Maria Chica – cleaning employee from Napumoceno who becomes pregnant with Napumoceno. With her pregnancy, she retired from work and went to live in Lombo de Tanque with a pension provided by the company Araújo Lda.
- Américo Ferreira - a friend of Napumoceno's family, acts as executor.
- Adélia - Napumoceno's passion, with uncertain whereabouts after his death. Napumoceno left him the book Só by António Nobre in his will .
- Eduarda - Napumoceno's last maid, is the last person to see him alive.

== Publications ==
- Ilhéu Editora, São Vicente, 1989 ISBN 972-21-0575-2
- French translation: Édouard Bailby, Sépia Publishers, Saint-Maur, 1995
- Basque translation: Txalaparta, 2002, title: Napumoceno da Silva Araujo jaunaren testamentua
- English translation: New Directions, 2004
