= Augusta Conchiglia =

Italian war photographer (born 1948)

- Born: 1948; Gallarate, Lombardy, Italy
- Occupation: Photographer
- Known for: Photographic work in Angola

Augusta Conchiglia (born 1948) is an Italian journalist and photographer. She works in particular on Africa, anti-colonial movements and their geopolitical issues. She is best known for the five months she spent in Angola in 1968, in which she helped to produce a television documentary on the Angolan War of Independence and took many photographs.

== Biography ==
Conchiglia was born in Gallarate in Lombardy in 1948. She studied history and geography. In 1968, influenced by the films of Joris Ivens about the Vietnam War, she went to Angola, then a Portuguese colony, with the journalist and filmmaker Stefano De Stefani. While they were planning the trip they met with Joyce Lussu, a writer and translator of anti-colonial authors. Through her, they met the Angolan rebel leader and eventual first president of independent Angola, Agostinho Neto, who often passed through Rome; Italy being one of the few western European countries to give him a visa.

De Stefani exploited his contacts with the state broadcaster, Rai, and in particular with the journalist and broadcaster, Emilio Fede, who directed a Rai programme called TV7. On the way to Angola, De Stefani and Conchiglia made a number of reports, including one on the discovery of a second room of a pharaoh in an Egyptian pyramid. Arriving clandestinely in Angola, via Lusaka, capital of Zambia, where they also prepared a report for Rai, they went to an area where the People's Movement for the Liberation of Angola (MPLA) had several bases, staying there for five months guided by MPLA guerrillas and travelling hundreds of kilometres in the MPLA areas of Moxico and Cuando Cubango. The guerrilla warfare had begun in 1966 after Kenneth Kaunda, first president of Zambia, had authorized cross-border activities.

Conchiglia and De Stefani made a 90-minute film that was shown on Italian television and also shown at the Algiers Pan-African Festival of 1969. They returned to Angola in 1970, together with a camera crew from the Italian far-left organization, Lotta Continua (The Struggle Continues), but after disagreements ended up making two separate films. That made by Conchiglia and De Stefani was called A proposito del'Angola (On the subject of Angola - 1973).

With two Nikon F cameras she took thousands of photographs on her trips to Angola and some received wide circulation at the time. In Italy a feature on Angola using her photographs appeared in the weekly magazine L'Espresso. Her images of daily life and of the poorly dressed rebels, marching with sticks instead of guns, attracted the attention of the international community and led to a book, Guerra di Popolo in Angola (1969) They were also used in short films made by Sarah Maldoror and William Klein and on the cover of a record of Angolan songs, plays and speeches that she and De Stefani recorded. Her work was not seen in Portugal until the overthrow of the Estado Novo dictatorship in 1974.

Conchiglia spent some time in Angola after that country's independence. She now lives in Paris. She has contributed to many publications, such as the New Left Review, Afrique-Asie and Le Monde diplomatique.

== Recent exhibitions ==
The work of Conchiglia has been shown at:

- Augusta Conchiglia nos Trilhos da Frente Leste – Imagens (e Sons) da Luta de Libertação em Angola, Aljube Museum, Lisbon, 2021. This exhibition involved the digitizing of over 1000 black and white negatives.
- Fontainebleau Art History Festival, 2022
