= Ruy Duarte de Carvalho =

Angolan author and filmmaker (1941–2010)

- Born: Ruy Alberto Duarte Gomes de Carvalho; 22 April 1941; Santarém, Portugal
- Died: 12 August 2010 (aged 69); Swakopmund, Namibia
- Resting place: Namib
- Citizenship: Angolan
- Education: Ph.M in Visual anthropology PhD in Ethnology and Social anthropology – School for Advanced Studies in the Social Sciences
- Occupations: poet, writer, traveller, anthropologist, agriculturist, filmmaker
- Writing career
- Language: Portuguese
- Period: 1972–2010

Ruy Alberto Duarte Gomes de Carvalho (22 April 1941 – 12 August 2010) was an Angolan author and filmmaker, whose work, which over more than three decades spanned poetry, metafiction, and anthropology, focused on the Kuvale people of the southern Angola.

== Life and career ==
Writing for Carvalho's entry in the Dictionary of African Biography (2012), Livia Apa commented that even if "In their complexity, Ruy Duarte de Carvalho's works are some of the most interesting and original works in contemporary Portuguese literature. Curiously, in spite of its importance, his work is rarely translated or taught abroad. Only a few of his books have been recently published in Brazil, and most of his films have disappeared, or been lost or badly damaged." Since 2016, some of the films he directed between 1975 and 1989 can be watched online at RDC Virtual.

Carvalho is highly influenced by the work of fellow Angolan writer José Luandino Vieira and by the Brazilian writer João Guimarães Rosa. Rosa's influence on Carvalho's work can be seem in the novel Desmedida (2006), whose narrative often overlaps with some of the Brazilian author's canon, including intertextual references to Rosa's novel Grande sertão: veredas (The Devil to Pay in the Backlands). The book Desmedida (Unmeasured) is deliberately divided between two-halves, but there's a "third half", the metafiction novel A terceira metade (2009), which is announced at the end of Desmedida and whose title echoes Rosa's short story A terceira margem do rio (The Third Bank of the River).

In 2023, Ruy Duarte de Carvalho was posthumously awarded with an "Order of Civil Merit, 1st Degree" by the president of Angola.

== Bibliography ==
- Chão de oferta (1972), poetry
- A decisão da idade (1976), poetry
- Como se o mundo não tivesse leste: estórias do sul e seca (1977), short stories
- Exercícios de crueldade (1978), poetry
- Sinais misteriosos... já se vê... (1979), poetry
- O camarada e a câmara: cinema e antropologia para além do filme etnográfico (1980), essay
- Ondula, savana branca (1982), poetry
- Lavra paralela (1987), poetry
- Hábito da terra (1988), poetry
- Ana a manda: os filhos da rede (1989), essay
- Memória de tanta guerra (1992), poetry anthology
- Ordem de esquecimento (1997), poetry
- Aviso à navegação (1997), essay
- A câmara, a escrita e a coisa dita...: fitas, textos e paletras (1997), essay
- Vou lá visitar pastores (1999), essay
- Lavra reiterada (2000), poetry
- Observação directa (2000), poetry
- Os papéis do inglês (2000), metafiction
- Os Kuvale na história, nas guerras e nas crises: artigos e comunicações 1994–2001 (2002), essay
- Actas da Maianga (2003), essay
- Lavra: poesia reunida 1970–2000 (2005), poetry anthology
- As paisagens propícias (2005), metafiction
- Desmedida: Luanda, São Paulo, São Francisco e volta (2006), travel literature
- A terceira metade (2009), metafiction
