= Vera Mantero =

Portuguese ballet dancer and choreographer

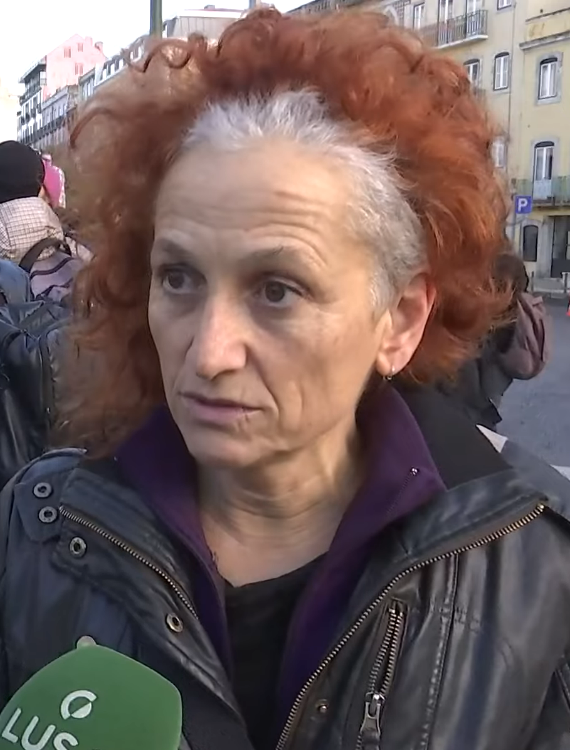
Vera Mantero in 2023

Vera Mantero (born 1966) is a Portuguese dancer and choreographer. After performing for five years with the Gulbenkian Ballet, she turned to choreography in 1987 and has since performed widely in Europe and North and South America. A major figure in new Portuguese dance, she frequently improvises with Mark Tompkins, Meg Stuart and Steve Paxton.
