= Francisco Manso =

Portuguese filmmaker (born 1949)

- Born: Francisco Manso; November 28, 1949 (age 76); Lisbon, Portugal
- Education: University of Lisbon
- Occupations: Director, writer, producer
- Years active: 1976–present

Francisco Manso (born 28 November 1949), is a Portuguese filmmaker and producer. He is best known as the director of the critically acclaimed films, Napomuceno's Will, The Consul of Bordeaux and O Nosso Cônsul em Havana.

== Career ==
He graduated in law at the University of Lisbon. In 1976, he graduated in film at Centro de Arte e Comunicação Visual (Ar.Co) and, in 1979 to 1980, completed courses in sound engineering and became the assistant director at the public television service Rádio e Televisão de Portugal (RTP).

In 1978, he moved to cinema as the first assistant director for the film O Meu Nome É, directed by Fernando Matos Silva. This was followed by O Príncipe com Orelhas de Burro, directed by António de Macedo, in 1979. In 1980, he moved to Guinea Bissau and worked on the film Acto dos Feitos da Guiné which was directed by Matos Silva. In the following year, he returned to Portugal and worked on Matos Silva's 1981 film Guerra no Mirandum.

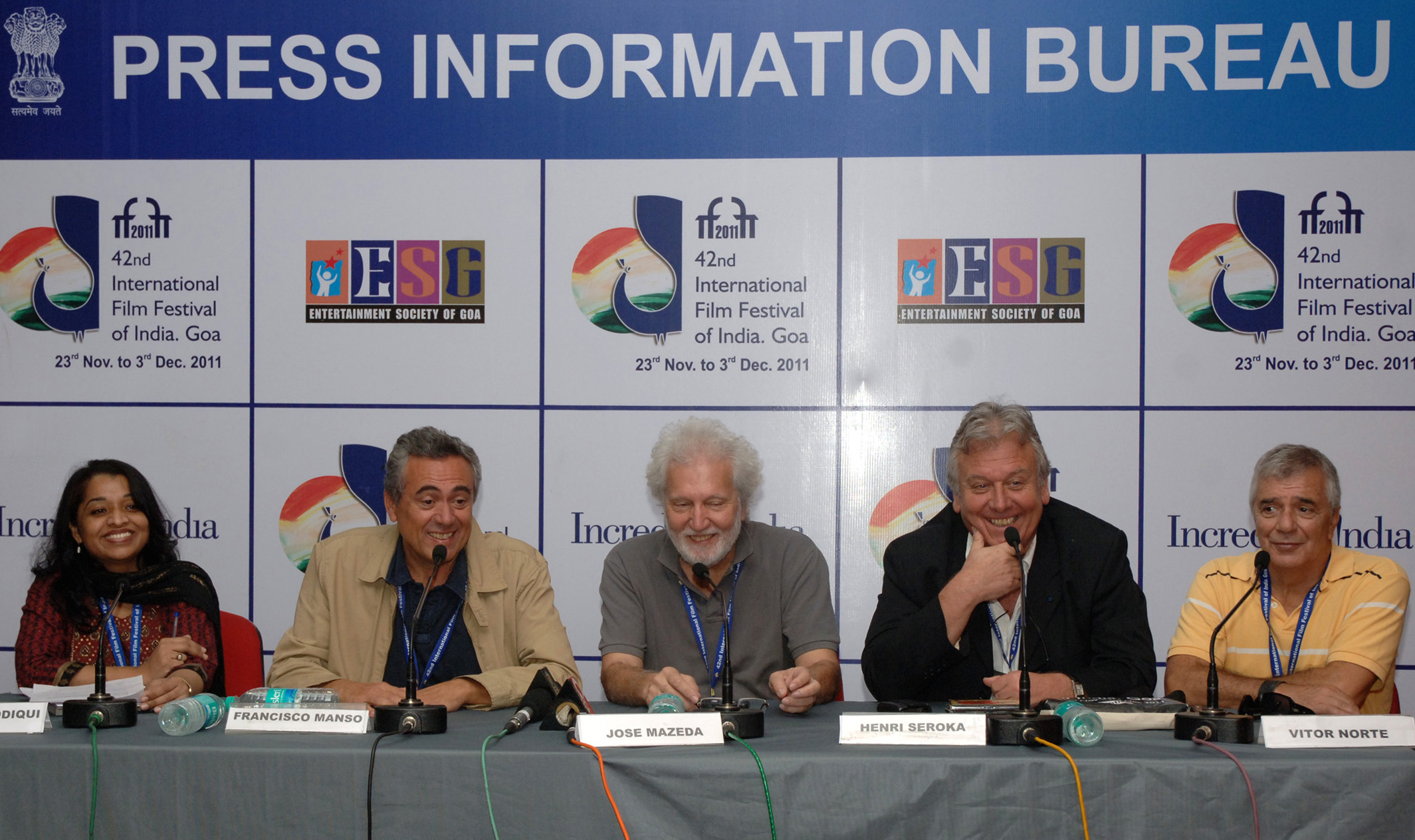
The film director, Francisco Manso (second from left) with the actor Vitor Norte, the producer, Jose Mazeda, and the composer Henri Seroka addressing a press conference during the 42nd International Film Festival of India (IFFI-2011)

After working as an assistant for many years, Manso's first directing work was in 1983 with the television documentary A Epopeia dos Bacalhaus. He also edited his first television feature film, Terra Nova, Mar Velho, in the same year. With the success of that film, he continued to direct films and documentaries such as, A Aposta (1987), Na Mão de Deus(1989), Nostalgia (1994) and O Espírito da Cor (1994).

In 1997, Manso produced his first cinema feature film, O Testamento do Senhor Napomuceno, based on the novel The Last Will and Testament of Senhor da Silva Araújo by Germano Almeida about the Cape Verde Islands. The film was distributed internationally and was screened at film festivals, receiving several awards including three at the Gramado Film Festival. In 2000, he made the TV mini-series Almeida Garrett. His documentary, Memórias de um rio - Avieiros, os nómadas do Tejo in 2004, was awarded the special prize for Lusophony at the 10th Environmental Film Festival - Cine Eco 2004.

In his following films he mostly used historical events, such as the 2008 film O Último Condenado à Morte, which took place at the time of the Liberal Revolution in Portugal in 1821/22. In 2011, he made the film O Cônsul de Bordéus which was based on the life of Aristides de Sousa Mendes and his services to humanity during the persecution of the Jews.

== Filmography ==
Year	Film	Role	Genre	Ref.
1976	O Caldo de Pedra	Production manager	Short film	
1978	O Meu Nome É...	Actor	Film	
1979	Os Filhos da Noite	Actor	Film	
1979	O Convidado Debaixo da Mesa	Production assistant	TV movie	
1980	The Donkey-Eared Prince	Assistant director	Film	
1980	Acto dos Feitos da Guiné	Assistant director	Film	
1983	A Epopeia dos Bacalhaus	Director, writer	TV movie	
1983	Terra Nova, Mar Velho	Director, producer, writer	Documentary	
1987	A Aposta	Director, producer	Film	
1989	O Espírito da Cor	Director	TV series documentary	
1994	Na Mão de Deus (Antero de Quental)	Director, producer	TV movie	
1994	Nostalgia	Director	Film	
1994	Quase (Mário de Sá Carneiro)	Director, producer	TV movie	
1995	Saudade (Soares dos Reis)	Director, producer	TV movie	
1997	O Testamento do Senhor Napomuceno	Director, producer	Film	
2000	Almeida Garrett	Director, producer	TV mini-series	
2000	Dez Grãozinhos de Terra	Director, producer	Documentary	
2000	Clandestinos	Director	Documentary	
2003	O Cinema Português	Director, producer, writer	TV movie documentary)	
2009	A Ilha dos Escravos	Director	Film	
2009	O Último Condenado à Morte	Director	Film	
2010	Assalto ao Santa Maria	Director	Film	
2010	Portugal e o Japão - Uma Longa História	Director	TV movie documentary)	
2010	Entre o Norte e o Sul	Director	Documentary	
2011	O Cônsul de Bordéus	Director	Film	
2012	Até Chá virar Café: Until Tea Becomes Coffee	Producer	TV movie documentary	
2016	Regresso Ao Mar	Director, producer	TV series documentary	
2018	Os Dois Irmãos	Director	Film	
2019	O Nosso Cônsul em Havana	Director, producer	TV series	
2019	Salgueiro Maia - Rumo à Eternidade	Director, writer	Documentary short	

== See also ==
- Portuguese Colonial War
- List of Portuguese films of 2008
- List of Portuguese films of 2010
