= Nuno Melo (actor) =

Portuguese actor

- Born: 8 February 1960; Castelo Branco, Portugal
- Died: 9 June 2015 (aged 55); Lisbon, Portugal
- Other name: Nuno Jorge Lopes de Melo Cardoso
- Occupation: Actor
- Years active: 1982-2015

Nuno Melo (8 February 1960 – 9 June 2015) was a Portuguese actor. He appeared in more than ninety films from 1982 to 2015.

== Biography ==
Melo was born in Castelo Branco on 8 February 1960. He worked as a cinema, theatre and television actor. He died of liver cancer in Lisbon on 9 June 2015. He was buried in the Alto de S. João cemetery on 10 June. He had a daughter (born 1987).

== Selected filmography ==
Film
Year	Title	Role	Notes
1998	Traffic	Gigolo	
2005	O Crime do Padre Amaro		
2011	Estrada de Palha		
2014	Virados do Avesso		

TV
Year	Title	Role	Notes
2004-2005	Senhora do Destino	Constantino	
2012-2013	Doce Tentação	Elias Pereira	
