= Paixão (film) =

- Film poster
- Directed by: Margarida Gil
- Written by: Margarida Gil; Maria Velho da Costa
- Produced by: Paulo Branco
- Starring: Carloto Cotta; Ana Brandão
- Production companies: Clap Filmes; Alfama Films
- Release date: February 9, 2012 (Portugal)
- Running time: 75 minutes
- Country: Portugal
- Language: Portuguese

Paixão is a 2012 Portuguese film directed by Margarida Gil.

== Cast ==
- Carloto Cotta as João Lucas
- Ana Brandão as Maria Salomé
