= The Great Kilapy =

2012 film directed by Zézé Gamboa

- Directed by: Zézé Gamboa
- Written by: Luís Alvarães; Luis Carlos Patraquim
- Starring: Lázaro Ramos; Pedro Hossi; João Lagarto; Hermila Guedes; Buda Lira; Patrícia Bull; Pedro Carraca; Adriana Rebello; Alberto Magassela
- Cinematography: Mario Masini
- Edited by: Pascal Latil
- Music by: David Linx; Diederik Wissels
- Production companies: David & Golias; Raíz Produções Cinematográficas; Gamboa & Gamboa
- Distributed by: Imovision (Brazil)
- Release dates: 7 September 2012 (TIFF); 2014 (Brazil)
- Running time: 100 minutes
- Countries: Angola; Brazil; Portugal
- Language: Portuguese

The Great Kilapy (Portuguese: O Grande Kilapy) is a 2012 comedy-drama film directed by Zézé Gamboa. The film was an international co-production between companies in Angola, Brazil and Portugal.

== Plot ==
Joao Fraga is a young Angolan, the descendant of a rich family from the colonial period. This mestizo boy just wants to live his life, having fun with friends and spending his money. Although he is the Senior Executive of the National Bank of Angola, he diverts the institution's own funds, distributing money to colleagues and activists for the liberation of Angola. Joao goes to jail, but when he got out of prison, is upheld by society as a local hero.
