= João Reis =

Portuguese footballer

Personal information
- Full name: João Carlos Silva Reis
- Date of birth: 24 June 1992 (age 34)
- Place of birth: Loulé, Portugal
- Height: 1.74 m (5 ft 9 in)
- Position: Left back

Team information
- Current team: Portimonense
- Number: 17

Youth career
- 2003–2011: Louletano

Senior career*
Years	Team	Apps	(Gls)
2011–2013	Louletano	52	(8)
2013–2014	Farense	36	(5)
2014–2016	Chaves	50	(7)
2016–2018	Santa Clara	76	(5)
2018–2020	Tondela	11	(0)
2020–2021	Chaves	29	(0)
2021–2022	Varzim	30	(0)
2022–2024	Estrela da Amadora	52	(2)
2024–2025	Vizela	13	(0)
2025–	Portimonense	31	(4)

International career^{‡}
2012	Portugal U21	1	(0)
- * Club domestic league appearances and goals as of 20 June 2026 ‡ National team caps and goals as of 14 November 2012

João Carlos Silva Reis (born 24 June 1992) is a Portuguese footballer who plays for Portimonense as a defender.

== Football career ==
On 27 July 2013, Reis made his professional debut with Farense in a 2013–14 Taça da Liga match against Santa Clara, when he started and played the full game. In the first match of the 2013–14 Segunda Liga season against Portimonense on the 10 August, he made his league debut.

On 30 June 2021, he signed with Varzim.

On 15 July 2025, Reis joined Portimonense.
