= Isabel Abreu =

Portuguese actress

- Born: 3 March 1978 (age 47); Arronches, Portugal
- Spouse: Tiago Guedes

Isabel Abreu (born 3 March 1978 in Arronches, Portugal) is a Portuguese actress and TV presenter.

Abreu's film credits include Uma Vida à Espera and Entre os Dedos. Her television credits include Rainha das Flores Os Boys and Pai à Força.

Abreu is married to director Tiago Guedes.
