= The Hero (2004 film) =

- French theatrical poster.
- Directed by: Zézé Gamboa
- Written by: Carla Baptista; Pierre-Marie Goulet; Fernando Vendrell
- Produced by: Fernando Vendrell
- Starring: Oumar Makena Diop; Milton 'Santo' Coelho; Maria Ceiça
- Cinematography: Mario Masini
- Edited by: Anna Ruiz
- Music by: David Linx; Diederik Wissels
- Release dates: May 18, 2004 (Cannes); December 7, 2005 (France)
- Running time: 97 minutes
- Countries: Angola; France; Portugal
- Language: Portuguese

The Hero (Portuguese: O Herói; French: Un héros) is a 2004 Angolan-Portuguese-French film directed by Zézé Gamboa. It was filmed on location in Angola and won the World Dramatic Competition Grand Prize at the 2005 Sundance Film Festival.

== Plot ==
The Hero follows the intersecting lives of four individuals living in Luanda in the wake of the Angolan Civil War: Vitório, a war veteran crippled by a landmine in search of a job; Manu, a ten-year-old boy searching for his father four years after his disappearance; Joana, a second-grade teacher who mentors Manu; and Judite/Maria Barbara, a prostitute who begins a romantic relationship with Vitório.

== Reception ==
In addition to its Sundance award, The Hero received awards from over twenty-five other film festivals.
