= The Legendary Tigerman =

Portuguese singer-songwriter (born 1970)

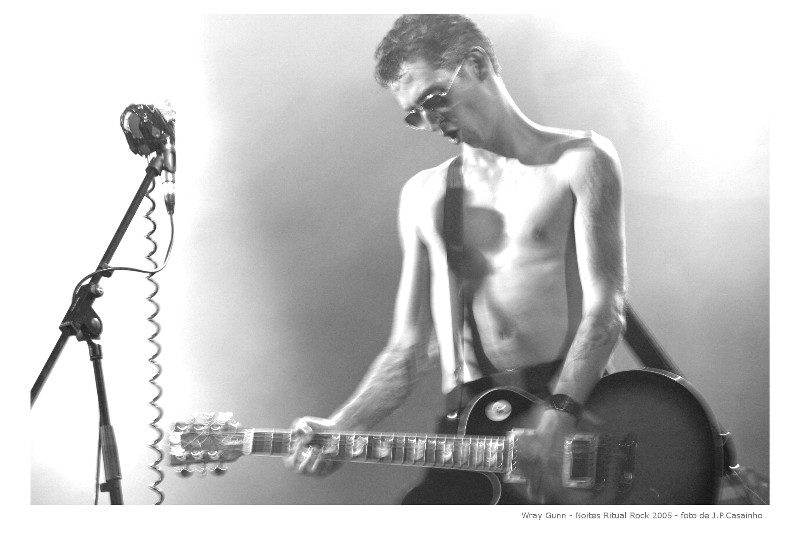
- Furtado in 2005

Background information
- Born: Paulo Furtado; 9 September 1970 (age 55); Portuguese Mozambique
- Genres: Blues rock; punk blues; blues
- Instruments: Vocals; guitar; harmonica; drums
- Years active: 1989–present (since 2002 as The Legendary Tigerman)
- Labels: Subnotick Enterprises; MetroDiscos; Sony Music

Paulo Furtado (born 9 September 1970) is a Portuguese singer-songwriter who performs under the stage name The Legendary Tigerman. He started his music career in the late 1980s when he joined the psychobilly band Tédio Boys. After leaving Tédio Boys, Furtado founded in 2000 the blues rock band Wraygunn. In 2002, he began releasing solo music under the alias The Legendary Tigerman.

The Legendary Tigerman started out as a one-man band project, where he would accompany his singing with guitar, harmonica and drums alone on stage. Since 2014, he also plays with a backing band. The Legendary Tigerman has released seven studio albums to date.

== Biography ==
Furtado was born in Portuguese Mozambique, where he lived until he was one year old. He then moved to Coimbra, Portugal with his parents. Later, he enrolled at Lisbon University to study Human Movement Science but dropped out after three days, considering the studies pointless. He then focused a lot on surfing, becoming a local body board hero.

Furtado's musical career began in the late 1980s as the lead guitarist and songwriter in the Portuguese psychobilly band Tédio Boys. The group released three albums during the 1990s and embarked on a U.S. tour. In 1999, after leaving Tédio Boys, Furtado founded the Coimbra-based blues rock outfit Wraygunn, in which he plays lead guitar and sings alongside Raquel Ralha. The band has released five albums.

During this period, Furtado began a solo career as The Legendary Tigerman. He released his first album, Naked Blues, on the Subotnick Enterprises label in 2001. While working with Subotnick Enterprises, he released the follow-up, Fuck Christmas, I Got the Blues (2003) and the remix compilation In Cold Blood (2004). Switching to Rastilho Records, he produced Masquerade in 2006, which won him critical acclaim. In 2009 he joined Jarvis Cocker on a successful tour.

Following this, he switched to EMI to produce his fifth solo album, Femina, a record about women, which featured collaborations with female singers including Asia Argento, Peaches, Lisa Kekaula, Becky Lee, Phoebe Killdeer, Cibelle, Maria de Medeiros. It became one of the top five albums on the Portuguese charts.

A year later, Femina went platinum in Portugal and was named Record of the Year by newspapers and magazines including Les Inrockuptibles, Rock & Folk, Telerama, and El Pais.

== Discography ==
He has released seven albums:

- 2002: Naked Blues – Subotnick Enterprises
- 2003: Fuck Christmas, I Got the Blues – Subotnick Enterprises
- 2004: In Cold Blood – Subotnick Enterprises
- 2006: Masquerade – Nortesul/BMG
- 2009: Femina – Metrodiscos
- 2014: True – Metropolitana/Sony Music Portugal
- 2018: Misfit – Metropolitana/Sony Music Portugal
- 2023: Zeitgeist
