= Carlos Paulo =

Angolan actor and writer

- Born: Carlos Paulo; June 11, 1951 (age 75); Angola
- Occupations: Actor, writer, costume designer (theater)
- Years active: 1967–present

Carlos Paulo (born 11 June 1951), is an Angola actor and writer. He is best known for the roles in the films Operation Autumn, The Consul of Bordeaux and Cacau da Ribeira.

== Filmography ==
Year	Film	Role	Genre	Ref.
1968	A Chave	Actor	TV movie	
1969	Uma Mulher Formidável	João	TV movie	
1969	Zip Zip	Actor	TV series	
1969	Transmissão Interrompida	Actor	TV movie	
1969	Caixa de Pandora	Arlequim	TV movie	
1969	As Deambulações do Mensageiro Alado	Winged Messenger	Film	
1970	Música no Andar de Cima	Actor	TV movie	
1974	Entremês Famoso Sobre da Pesca no Rio Minho	Actor	Film	
1980	Cerromaior	Adriano	Film	
1980	O Dragão	Burgomestre	TV movie	
1983	Allegro	Various Roles	TV series	
1984	O Chapéu Mágico	Actor	TV movie	
1985	Fui de Visita à Minha Tia a Marrocos	Saltarico Formiguito	TV series	
1985	Morte D'Homem	Silvino	TV movie	
1985	Duarte & C.a	Actor	TV series	
1985	Amadis	Amadis	TV movie	
1986	Crónicas de Bem Dizer	Actor	TV series	
1986	Ora Agora Conto Eu...	Storyteller	TV series	
1986	Carnaval infernal	Actor	TV movie	
1986	A Quinta do Dois	Narrator	TV series	
1987	Victor ou As Crianças no Poder	Victor	TV movie	
1987	Os Cozinheros de Oz	Actor	TV movie	
1987	A Borboleta na Gaiola	Albano	TV movie	
1987	Concordo... Ou Talvez Não	Writer	TV series	
1988	Cacau da Ribeira	Cigano, writer	TV mini-series	
1988	Cárie e Bactério	Bactério	TV movie	
1989	Lugar de Encontro	Writer	TV series	
1989	Socorro, Sou uma Mulher de Sucesso	Writer	TV movie	
1990	Cartas de Humor	Writer	TV series	
1991	O Mandarim	Narrator	TV mini-series	
1992	A Esfera de Ki	Actor	TV series	
1992	Os Contos do Mocho Sábio	Marco Polo	TV series	
1993	Apresentação Canal 4: TVI	Pai	TV movie	
1993	E o Resto é Conversa	Writer	TV series	
1993	Terra Instável	Aurélio Gouveia	TV series	
1993	Ora Bolas Marina	Writer	TV series	
1994	Uma Vida Normal	Police Officer	Film	
1994	Ideias Com História	Gil Vicente / Chou-en-Lai	TV series	
1995	Grande Plano	Writer	TV series	
1995	Cabaret	Various Roles, writer	TV series	
1996	Festival RTP da Canção	Actor	TV movie	
1996	Marina Dona Revista	Writer	TV series	
1996	Todos ao Palco	Various Roles, writer	TV series	
1996	Sim, Sr. Ministro	Bernardo Olivença	TV series	
1996	Saudades do Futuro	Various Roles, writer	TV movie	
1996	Marlowe: O Crime das Vacas Loucas	Boss / Porao da Nau / Landeiro	TV movie	
1997	Festival RTP da Canção	Actor, writer	TV movie	
1997	Polícias	Álvaro	TV series	
1997	O Fusível	Actor	TV movie	
1997	As Lições do Tonecas	Actor	TV series	
1998	Festival RTP da Canção	Actor, writer	TV movie	
1998	Paris Hotel	Paillardin	TV movie	
2000	A Importância de Ser Constante	John	TV movie	
2000	Festival RTP da Canção 2000	Actor, writer	TV movie	
2001	Sabado à Noite	Writer	TV series	
2001	Harry Potter and the Sorcerer's Stone	voice	Video game	
2002	Gala 45 Anos RTP	Actor: Various role, writer	TV movie	
2007	A Casa da Lenha	Fernando Lopes Graça	TV movie	
2010	Assalto ao Santa Maria	Henrique Galvão	Film	
2011	Quadrado de Amor Bizarro	Encenador	Short film	
2011	The Consul of Bordeaux	Chaim Kruger	Film	
2012	Balas & Bolinhos: O Último Capítulo	Tito	Film	
2012	Operation Autumn	Adolfo Ayala	Film	
2013	Estranhamento	Recepcionista	Short film	
2017	As Árvores Morrem de Pé	Maurício	TV movie	
2019	Como Se Fosse O Último	Homem do Fato Príncipe de Gales	Short film	
