= Dead Combo =

Portuguese band

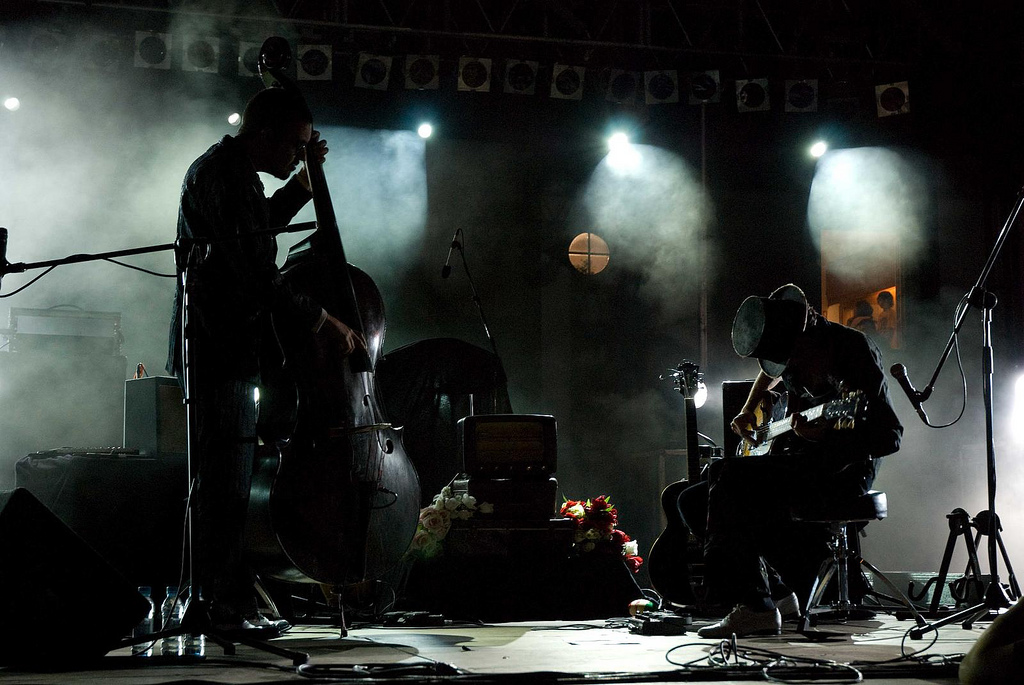
- Dead Combo live at Festival M.U.N.D.O. in Viana do Castelo

Background information
- Origin: Portugal
- Genres: Instrumental, world music, blues, rock
- Years active: 2003–2021
- Labels: Dead & Company; Rastilho Records; Universal Music; Sony Music
- Past members: Tó Trips; Pedro Gonçalves
- Website: www.deadcombo.net

Dead Combo were a Portuguese band, consisting of Tó Trips and Pedro Gonçalves. Dead Combo played mostly instrumental music with a wide range of influences, such as Latin American music, Spaghetti Western film soundtracks, fado, African music, blues, rock, and others.

== History ==
Dead Combo were formed in 2003 after Tó Trips and Pedro Gonçalves got an invitation from Henrique Amaro, from the Portuguese radio station Antena 3, to record the track “Paredes Ambience” for an homage album to the late Portuguese guitar player Carlos Paredes, called Movimentos Perpétuos: Música para Carlos Paredes.

Their debut album, Vol. I, was released in 2004. It was followed by Vol. II – Quando a Alma não é Pequena in 2006. Both albums were released through their own newly-founded publishing company Dead & Company, in partnership with Universal Records Portugal. These albums are very "visual", having strong musical allusions to the underground scene of Lisbon of past times, the aesthetic worlds of design, art, and most of all cinema. Two of their videos highly illustrate this visual music style: Vol. I's single "Cacto" and Vol. II's "Quando a alma não é pequena #1". Vol. I was included in Charlie Gillett's list of best world albums in 2005. He also included a track from Vol. I, "Rumbero", in his 2005 compilation album Sound of the World.

Afterwards, they released the album Guitars From Nothing in 2007 and Lusitânia Playboys in 2008. Lusitânia Playboys was considered "album of the decade" by the Portuguese newspaper Expresso. Their fifth album, Lisboa Mulata, was released in 2011, and included the participation of American guitarist Marc Ribot. It was nominated for the Golden Globe for Best Album's Group in the Portuguese Golden Globes.

In April 2012, Dead Combo were featured in the Lisbon episode of Anthony Bourdain's No Reservations. Their music was the soundtrack for the whole episode. Subsequently, three of their albums reached the top ten on the North-American iTunes charts. Afterwards, they played in the premiere party for David Cronenberg's film Cosmopolis, at the Cannes Film Festival, in 2012. In 2014, they released the album A Bunch of Meninos, which reached number one in the Portuguese record chart. In 2016, they released Dead Combo e as Cordas da Má Fama, in which they re-recorded previous songs with a strings trio consisting of Pedro Tony Gomes, Bruno Silva and Denys Stetsenko. In 2017, they embarked on a world tour, which included shows in Spain, Cape Verde, the Cappadox Festival in Turkey, and a concert in New York at the Summer Stage Festival held at Central Park, in which they invited Marc Ribot to play. In 2018, they released the album Odeon Hotel, produced by Alain Johannes and featuring vocals by Mark Lanegan. Lanegan joined the band on stage, during their Odeon Hotel tour, in the concerts at the Paredes de Coura festival, Coliseu do Recreios in Lisbon and Centro Cultural Vila Flor in Guimarães.

On 1 October 2019, Dead Combo announced they would disband after their next tour. The tour, named "Fim" (End), was initially scheduled to run from December 2019 to March 2020, but some of the final shows were postponed because of the COVID-19 pandemic and Pedro Gonçalves' health problems. The shows were rescheduled to the end of 2021 but were cancelled on 2 November 2021 because of Gonçalves' health deterioration. Gonçalves died of cancer on 4 December 2021, thus marking the end of Dead Combo.

== Media appearances ==
=== Film ===
The songs "Rumbero" and "Lisboa Mulata" were included in the film, Focus (2015) by Glenn Ficarra.

=== Television ===
The band was featured in the episode "Lisbon" of Anthony Bourdain's television show No Reservations, which aired on 30 April 2012.

=== Video games ===
The song "Eléctrica Cadente" was included in the soundtrack of the video game Alan Wake.

== Members ==
- Tó Trips – electric guitar, acoustic guitar
- Pedro V. Gonçalves – double bass, electric guitar, melodicas, keyboards

== Discography ==
=== Studio albums ===
- Vol. I (2004)
- Vol. II - Quando a Alma não é Pequena (2006)
- Guitars from Nothing (2007)
- Lusitânia Playboys (2008)
- Lisboa Mulata (2011)
- A Bunch of Meninos (2014)
- Dead Combo e as Cordas da Má Fama (2016)
- Odeon Hotel (2018)

=== Live albums ===
- Live Hot Clube (2009)
- Live at Teatro São Luiz (2014)
- Live Vodafone Paredes de Coura (EP, 2019)
