= Germano Almeida =

Cape Verdean writer and lawyer

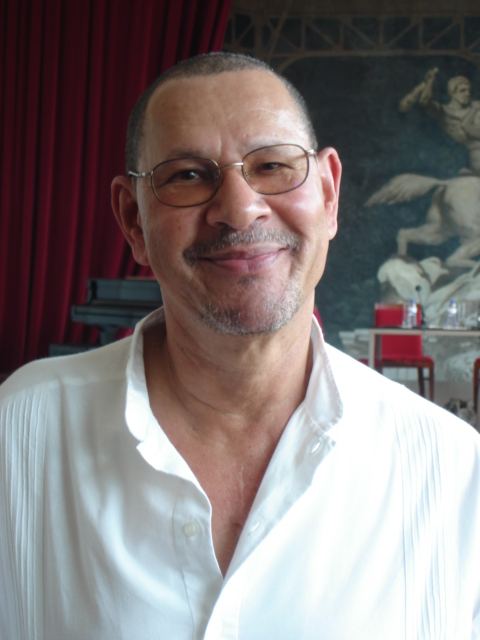
- Germano Almeida
- Born: 31 July 1945 (age 81); Boa Vista, Cape Verde
- Occupations: writer, lawyer
- Years active: 1982-present
- Awards: Order of the Dragon Plant; Order of Merit (Portugal); Camões Prize (2018)

Germano Almeida (Portuguese pronunciation: [ʒɨɾˈmɐnu alˈmejdɐ]; born 31 July 1945) is a Cape Verdean author and lawyer.

== Biography ==
Born on the Cape Verdean island Boa Vista, Almeida studied law at the University of Lisbon and currently practices in Mindelo. His novels have been translated into several languages. He married Filomena Figueiredo.

Almeida founded the literary magazine Ponto & Vírgula (1983-87) and Aguaviva. In 1989 he founded the Ilhéu Editora publishing house and has since published 16 books (nine novels).

=== Published works ===
His first work was O dia das calças roladas which was about an account of a strike on the island of Santo Antão, it was first written in 1982 and was published in 1983. He wrote the novel The Last Will and Testament of Senhor da Silva Araújo which was about businessman turned philanthropist who leaves his fortune to his illegitimate daughter. As independence comes he is shown up to be a relic of colonialism. A motion picture would be made about the novel in 1997 and was directed by the Portuguese director Francisco Manso, it won the award at the Brazil's largest film festival, the Festival de Cinema de Gramado. He later published Dona Pura e os Camaradas de Abril in 1999, a story about the 1974 Carnation revolution in Portugal. Cabo Verde – Viagem pela história das ilhas, published in 2003 was his historical presentation of all the nine inhabited islands that constitute Cape Verde. His recently published novels and works were Eva in 2006 and De Monte Cara vê-se o mundo in 2014.

=== Awards and honors ===
He has been awarded the Order of the Dragon Plant - First Class, the Portuguese Order of Merit and the Camões Prize (2018).

=== Adaptations ===
The 1995 novel The Two Brothers (Os Dois Irmãos) and Agravos de um Artista - a short story were performed as theatrical plays at the GTCCPPM in Mindelo, São Vicente in 1999 and in 2000. One of the roles were done by João Branco.

== Bibliography ==
- O dia das calças roladas (1982) First published on Ilhéu Editora, Cape Verde.
- The Last Will and Testament of Senhor da Silva Araújo (Ilhéu Editora, 1989, republished by New Directions, 2004) (Portuguese: "O Testamento do Senhor Napumoceno da Silva Araújo") ISBN 972-21-0575-2
- My Poet (1992) (Portuguese: "O meu poeta") ISBN 972-21-0786-0
- Fantastic Island (1994) (Portuguese: "A ilha fantástica") ISBN 972-21-0917-0
- Two Brothers (1995) (Portuguese: "Os dois irmãos") ISBN 972-211032-2
- Tales From the House (1996) (Portuguese: "Estórias de dentro de casa") (Short stories.) ISBN 972-211078-0.
- A morte do meu poeta (1998) Only published by the author, as it was too critical towards the ruling party at the time (MpD) for the local publisher, Ilhéu (actually he owns a part of the publishing company himself). The Poet turns into a corrupt politician and is eventually eaten by a shark!
- A Família Trago (1998) A funny family chronicle from the author's island of birth, Boa Vista) ISBN 972-21-1175-2
- Estórias contadas (1998) Chronicles published in the Portuguese newspaper Público
- Dona Pura e os Camaradas de Abril (1999) ISBN 972-21-1254-6
- As memórias de um espírito (2001) An account of an erotic life, told by the deceased's spirit. Almeida style humour! ISBN 972-21-1428-X
- Cabo Verde – Viagem pela história das ilhas (2003) ISBN 9789722115445
- O mar na Lajinha (2004) More erotic stories, from a group of people meeting regularly for a swim at the Lajinha beach on the island of São Vicente. ISBN 972-21-1609-6
- Eva: romance (2006) ISBN 972-21-1789-0
- A morte do ouvidor (2010) ISBN 978-972-21-2114-9
- De Monte Cara vê-se o mundo (2014)
- O Fiel Defunto (2018)
