= 65th Locarno Film Festival =

Film festival in Locarno, Switzerland

- Opening film: The Sweeney directed by Nick Love
- Location: Locarno, Switzerland
- Founded: 1946
- Awards: Golden Leopard: The Girl From Nowhere directed by Jean-Claude Brisseau
- Artistic director: Olivier Père
- Festival date: Opening: 1 August 2012; Closing: 11 August 2012
- Website: LFF

Locarno Film Festival
- 66th 64th

The 65th Locarno Film Festival was held from 1 to 11 August 2012 in Locarno, Switzerland. The opening film was the world premiere of The Sweeney directed by Nick Love. Director Souleymane Cisse was honored at the festival with a ceremony and retrospective of his work. Cisse also assisted in the Open Doors section this year, which focused on African films.

The Leopard of Honor, was awarded to French director Leos Carax, who attended the festival with his film Holy Motors. A complete retrospective of Carax's work was also featured at the festival. Another retrospective was held for the work of director Otto Preminger. The Locarno Excellence Award was given to Charlotte Rampling and Gael Garcia Bernal, who both attended the festival.

Rain forced many night screenings on the Piazza Grande, the 8,000 seat open-air theater, indoors to the smaller Favi theater. The GoPro shot documentary Leviatian and the docu-fiction Museum Hours directed by Jem Cohen were standouts amongst those reviewing the festival.

This was artistic director Olivier Père's last year at the festival after three years as its chef. Père stepped down to become the head of the French television network, ARTE.

The Golden Leopard, the festival's top prize, was awarded to The Girl From Nowhere directed by Jean-Claude Brisseau.The film had such a small budget, only €62,000 Euros, that just by winning the Golden Leopard's €90,000 Euro cash prize the film was profitable.

== Official Juries ==
=== Main Competition - (Concorso Internazionale) ===
- Apichatpong Weerasethakul, Thai director, Jury president
- Roger Avary, American screenwriter, producer and director
- Im Sang-soo, South Korean director
- Noémie Lvovsky, French director, screenwriter and actress
- Hans Ulrich Obrist, Swiss art curator and writer, co-director of the Serpentine Gallery in London

=== Filmmakers of the Present Competition - (Concorso Cineasti del Presente) ===
- Mahamat-Saleh Haroun, Chadian director
- Ana Moreira, Portuguese actress
- Alex Ross Perry, American director
- Luciano Rigolini, Swiss producer at ARTE
- Yuhang Ho, Malaysian filmmaker

=== Leopards of Tomorrow - (Pardi di domani) ===
- Mark Peploe, British screenwriter and director, Jury president
- Laurent Achard, French director
- Robin Harsch, Swiss actor and filmmaker
- Isabelle Mayor, Swiss director and programmer
- Kleber Mendonça Filho, Brazilian director

=== Best First Film ===
- Dennis Lim, film critic
- Boris Nelepo, film critic
- Abi Sakamoto, film programmer

== Official Sections ==
The following films were screened in these sections:

=== Piazza Grande ===
Piazza Grande: Prefestival

English Title	Original Title	Director(s)	Year	Production Country
1848		Dino Risi	1949	Italy
Rice Girl	La Risaia	Raffaello Matarazzo	1956	Italy
Rear Window		Alfred Hitchcock	1954	
Shouting Secrets		Korinna Sehringer	2011	Switzerland

Piazza Grande

English Title	Original Title	Director(s)	Year	Production Country
Bachelorette		Leslye Headland	2011	USA
Hello Sadness	Bonjour Tristesse	Otto Preminger	1958	USA
Camille Rewinds	Camille Redouble	Noémie Lvovsky	2012	France
The Miss Massacre	Das Missen Massaker	Michael Steiner	2012	Switzerland
Lore		Cate Shortland	2012	Germany
Magic Mike		Steven Soderbergh	2012	USA
More than Honey		Markus Imhoof	2012	Switzerland
Motorway		Soi Cheang	2012	Hong Kong
Lullaby Ride	Nachtlärm	Christoph Schaub	2012	Switzerland
No		Pablo Larraín	2012	Chile
A Few Hours of Spring	Quelques Heures De Printemps	Stéphane Brizé	2012	France
Ruby Sparks		Jonathan Dayton and Valerie Faris	2012	USA
Sightseers		Ben Wheatley	2012	Great Britain
The Sweeney		Nick Love	2012	Great Britain
While We Were Here		Kat Coiro	2012	USA
Wrong		Quentin Dupieux	2012	France

Piazza Grande: Shorts

Original Title	English Title	Director(s)	Year	Production Country
The Black Balloon		Benny Safdie, Josh Safdie	2012	USA

=== Main Competition ===
International Competition (Concorso Internazionale)

Original Title	English Title	Director(s)	Year	Production Country
A Última Vez Que Vi Macau	The Last Time I Saw Macao	João Rui Guerra da Mata, João Pedro Rodrigues	2012	Portugal
Berberian Sound Studio		Peter Strickland	2012	Great Britain
Compliance		Craig Zobel	2012	USA
Der Glanz Des Tages	The Shine of the Day	Tizza Covi, Rainer Frimmel	2012	Austria
Image Problem		Simon Baumann, Andreas Pfiffner	2012	Switzerland
Jack & Diane		Bradley Rust Gray	2011	USA
La Fille De Nulle Part	The Girl from Nowhere	Jean-Claude Brisseau	2012	France
Leviathan		Lucien Castaing-Taylor, Véréna Paravel	2012	Great Britain
Los Mejores Temas	The Best Themes	Nicolás Pereda	2012	Mexico
Mobile Home		François Pirot	2012	Belgium
Museum Hours		Jem Cohen	2012	Austria
Padroni Di Casa	The Landlords	Edoardo Gabbriellini	2012	Italy
Playback		Sho Miyake	2012	Japan
Polvo	Dust	Julio Hernández Cordón	2012	Guatemala
Somebody Up There Likes Me		Robert Byington	2011	USA
Starlet		Sean Baker	2012	USA
The End Of Time		Peter Mettler	2012	Switzerland
Une Estonienne À Paris	An Estonian in Paris	Ilmar Raag	2011	France
Wo Hai You Hua Yao Shuo	When Night Falls	Ying Liang	2012	South Korea

=== Filmmakers of the Present ===
The Concorso Cineasti del Presente, also known as the Filmmakers of the Present Competition, showcases first and second feature films from emerging filmmakers.

Filmmakers of the Present

Original Title	English Title	Director(s)	Production Country
Ape		Joel Potrykus	USA
Arraianos	Arraian	Eloy Enciso	Spain
Boa Sorte, Meu Amor	Good Luck, Sweetheart	Daniel Aragão	Brazil
Inori	To Anyone	Pedro González-Rubio	Japan
Ji Yi Wang Zhe Wo		Fang Song	China
Les Gouffres	The Abyss	Antoine Barraud	France
Les Mouvements Du Bassin	Basin Movements	HPG	France
Not In Tel Aviv		Nony Geffen	Israel
Orleans		Virgil Vernier	France
People'S Park		Libbie Dina Cohn, J. P. Sniadecki	USA
Tectonics		Peter Bo Rappmund	USA
Tower		Kazik Radwanski	Canada
Tutti Giù	All Down	Niccolò Castelli	Switzerland
Vakansi Yang Janggal Dan Penyakit Lainnya	Odd Vacans and Other Diseases	Noen Anggi	Indonesia
Winter, Go Away!		Elena Khoreva, Denis Klebleev, Askold Kurov, Dmitry Kusabov, Nadezhda Leonteva, Anna Moiseenko, Madina Mustafina, Sofia Rodkevich, Anton Seregin, Alexey Zhiriakov	Russia

=== Out of Competition ===
Out of Competition: Feature Films

Original Title	English Title	Director(s)	Year	Production Country
Age Is...		Stephen Dwoskin	2012	France
Chiri	It is	Naomi Kawase	2012	Japan
Fairy Queen		Jean-Paul Civeyrac	2012	France
Far From Afghanistan		John Gianvito, Jon Jost, Minda Martin, Soon- Mi Yoo, Travis Wilkerson	2012	USA
I, Anna		Barnaby Southcombe	2012	Great Britain
Ingrid Caven, Musique Et Voix	Ingrid Caven, Music and Voice	Bertrand Bonello	2012	France
La Richesse Du Loup	The Richness of the Wolf	Damien Odoul	2012	France
Les Coquillettes	The Shells	Sophie Letourneur	2012	France
L'Enclos Du Temps	The Time Enclosure	Jean-Charles Fitoussi	2012	France
Nami No Oto	Us Here	HAMAGUCHI Ryusuke, Kou Sakai	2011	Japan
Perret In Frankreich Und Algerien	Perret in France and Algeria	Heinz Emigholz	2012	Germany
Rio		Sarah Morris	2012	USA
The Capsule			2012	Greece

Out of Competition: Jeonju Digital Project

Original Title	English Title	Director(s)	Production Country
Light In The Yellow Breathing Space		Vimukthi Jayasundara	South Korea
The Great Cinema Party		Raya Martin	South Korea

=== Open Doors ===
This year's Open Doors section focused on African film.

Open Doors Screenings

Original Title	English Title	Director(s)	Year	Production Country
Aujourd'Hui	Today	Alain Gomis	2012	France
Bal Poussière	Dancing in the Dust	Henri Duparc	1989	Ivory Coast
Bamako		Abderrahmane Sissako	2006	Mali
Chocolat		Claire Denis	1988	France
Guimba, Un Tyran, Une Époque	Guimba, a Tyrant, an Era	Cheick Oumar Sissoko	1995	Mali
Il Va Pleuvoir Sur Conakry	He's Going to Rain on Conakry	Cheick Fantamady Camara	2007	Guinea
La Noire De...	Black Girl	Ousmane Sembène	1966	France
La Pirogue	The Pirogue	Moussa Touré	2012	Senegal
Le Clandestin	The Clandestine	Zeka Laplaine	1996	Congo
Le Damier, Papa National Oyé!	The Checkerboard, Dad National Oyé!	Balufu Bakupa-Kaniynda	1996	Congo
Le Monologue De La Muette	The Monologue of La Muette	Khady Sylla, Charles Van Damme	2008	Senegal
Muna Moto		Jean-Pierre Dikongué Pipa	1975	Cameroon
Po Di Sangui		Flora Gomes	1996	Guinea Bissau
Samba Traoré		Idrissa Ouédraogo	1992	Burkina Faso
Soleil O		Med Hondo	1969	France
Touki Bouki		Djibril Diop Mambéty	1973	Senegal
Une Fenêtre Ouverte	An Open Window	Khady Sylla	2005	Senegal
Visages De Femmes	Women's Faces	Désiré Ecaré	1985	Ivory Coast
Viva Riva!		Djo Tunda Wa Munga	2010	Congo
Wênd Kûuni	Photos of Kuuni	Gaston Kaboré	1982	Burkina Faso
Yeelen		Souleymane Cissé	1987	Mali

=== Leopards of Tomorrow ===
Leopards of Tomorrow (Pardi di Domani)

==== International Competition ====
International Competition Leopards of Tomorrow
Original Title	English Title	Director(s)	Year	Production Country
Back Of Beyond		Michael Lennox	2012	Great Britain
Birlikte	Together	Baris Corak	2012	Türkiye
Cavo D'Oro	Golden Cable	Siamak Etemadi	2012	Greece
Distants	Distance	Janno Jürgens	2012	Estonia
Feliz		Achille Milone	2012	Argentina
Fort Buchanan		Benjamin Crotty	2012	France
Homma Aailiyya		Amr Abdelhadi	2012	Giordania
Ismael		Sebastián Hofmann	2012	Mexico
Je Sens Le Beat Qui Monte En Moi	I Feel the Beat that Goes Up in Me	Yann Le Quellec	2012	France
Last Remarks		Umar Riaz	2012	Pakistan
Los Retratos	The Portraits	Iván D. Gaona	2012	Colombia
Meaning Of Robots		Matt Lenski	2011	USA
Mirakel Utmed Riksväg 43	Miracle along National Highway 43	Ronnie Sandahl	2012	Sweden
Nous Ne Serons Plus Jamais Seuls	We will Never be Alone Again	Yann Gonzalez	2012	France
O Que Arde Cura	What Does He Cure	João Rui Guerra da Mata	2012	Portugal
Rivers Return		Joe Vanhoutteghem	2011	Belgium
Roubama	Steal	Rakan Mayasi	2012	Lebanon
Sano Kiitos Ja Tanssi	Say Thanks and Dance	Antti Heikki Pesonen	2012	Finland
Serce Do Walki	Heart to Fight	Tomek Matuszczak	2011	Poland
Solo		Mina Yonezawa	2012	Japan
Suspended		Damian Walshe-Howling	2012	Australia
The Giant		David Raboy	2011	USA
The Mass of Men		Gabriel Gauchet	2012	Great Britain
The Pit		Itamar Lapid	2011	Israel
Yaderni Wydhody		Myroslav Slaboshpytskyi	2012	Ukraina
Zašto Slonovi?	Why Elephants?	Marko Mestrovic	2012	Croatia
Zwazo	Bird	Gabriel Abrantes	2012	Portugal
Über Rauhem Grund	About a Rough Reason	Youdid Kahveci	2012	Germany

==== National Competition ====
National Competition – Leopards of Tomorrow
Original Title	English Title	Director(s)	Year	Production Country
Homo Sapiens Cyborg		Stefano Mosimann	2012	Switzerland
Il Vulcano	The Volcano	Alice Riva	2012	Switzerland
Lamina		Christian Tschanz	2012	Switzerland
Le Jour Viendra	The Day will Come	Cicero Egli	2012	Switzerland
Les Ambassadeurs	Ambassadors	Maxime Matray, Alexia Walther	2012	Switzerland
Letzte Runde	Last Round	Kerstin Polte	2012	Switzerland
L'Amour Bègue	Bègue Love	Jan Czarlewski	2012	Switzerland
On The Beach		Marie-Elsa Sgualdo	2012	Switzerland
Radio-Actif	Radioactive	Nathan Hofstetter	2012	Switzerland

==== Author Shorts ====
Author Shorts (Corti d'artista) - Leopards of Tomorrow
Original Title	English Title	Director(s)	Year	Production Country
Biografi	Biography	Magnus Bärtås	2012	Sweden
Columbos		Takumi Kawai, Hiroki Okamura, Kawai+Okamura	2012	Japan
Concrete Parlay		Fern Silva	2012	USA
I First Saw The Light		Phillip Warnell	2012	Great Britain
Insight		Sebastian Diaz Morales	2012	Netherlands
Monumento	Monument	Gregorio Graziosi	2012	Brazil
Perspective Du Sous-Sol	Perspective of the Subsoil	Olivier Zabat	2012	France
The Creation As We Saw It		Ben Rivers	2012	Great Britain
The Hidden Conference: A Fractured Play		Rosa Barba	2011	Germany
The Name Is Not The Thing Named		Deborah Stratman	2012	USA
The Wave		Sarah Vanagt, Katrien Vermeire	2012	Belgium
Un Archipel	An Archipelago	Clément Cogitore	2011	France

==== Other Sections ====
Tribute To Curtas Vila Do Conde - Leopards of Tomorrow
Land Of My Dreams		Yann Gonzalez	2012	Portugal
O Canto Do Rocha	THE ROCK'S CORNER	Helvécio Marins Jr	2012	Portugal
O Milagre De Santo António		Sergei Loznitsa	2012	Portugal
Reconversão	Reconversion	Thom Andersen	2012	Portugal
Tribute To the Viennale - Leopards of Tomorrow
20 Little Films - Viennale Trailers 1995-2012		Martin Arnold, Bruce Baillie, James Benning, Stan Brakhage, Leos Carax, Jem Cohen, Gustav Deutsch, Ernie Gehr, Jean-Luc Godard, Ken Jacobs, David Lynch, Chris Marker, Jonas Mekas, Matthias Müller, Peter Tscherkassky, Agnès Varda, Apichatpong Weerasethakul		Austria
Enjoy Yourself		Gastón Solnicki	2012	Argentina
Rousseau's Fault (La Faute à Rousseau) - Leopards of Tomorrow
Chemin Faisant	Path	Georges Schwizgebel		Switzerland
Du Contrat Social	Social Contract	Frédéric Mermoud		Switzerland
Déposer Les Enfants	Put the Children	Antoine Jaccoud, Bettina Oberli		Switzerland
Le Goût De La Neige	The Taste of Snow	Nader Homayoun		Switzerland
Madame W		Jean-Daniel Schneider		Switzerland
Menuet	Minuet	Milagros Mumenthaler		Switzerland
Sakda		Apichatpong Weerasethakul		Switzerland

=== History (s) of Cinema ===
The festival's Histoire(s) du Cinéma section showcases films deemed significant to the evolution of cinema. Films by the festival's career award winners are presented in this section.

Histoire(s) du Cinéma
Original Title	English Title	Director(s)	Year	Production Country
Cinemasuisse: Jean-Luc Godard		Fabrice Aragno	2012	Switzerland
Gazzara		Joseph Rezwin	2012	USA
Iluminacja	The Illumination	Krzysztof Zanussi	1973	Poland
Kern		Veronika Franz and Severin Fiala	2012	Austria
Otto Preminger		André S. Labarthe	2012	France
Rocco E I Suoi Fratelli	Rocco and His Brothers	Luchino Visconti	1960	Italy
Room 237		Rodney Ascher	2012	USA
Twilight's Last Gleaming		Robert Aldrich	1977	USA
White Dog		Samuel Fuller	1982	USA
Ben Wheatley
Down Terrace		Ben Wheatley	2009	Great Britain
Kill List		Ben Wheatley	2011	Great Britain
Dino Risi Rediscovered
1848		Dino Risi	1949	Italy
La Fabbrica Del Duomo	The Fabbrica Del Duomo	Dino Risi	1949	Italy
La Provincia Dei Sette Laghi	The Province of the Seven Lakes	Dino Risi	1948	Italy
Tigullio Minore	Minor Tigullio	Dino Risi	1947	Italy
Verso La Vita	Towards Life	Dino Risi	1946	Italy
Hannes Schmidhauser
Hannes Pussy Schmidhauser		Victor J. Tognola	2012	Switzerland
Uli, Der Knecht	Uli, the Servant	Franz Schnyder	1954	Switzerland
Uli, Der Pächter	Uli, the Tenant	Franz Schnyder	1955	Switzerland
Naomi Kawase
Embracing		Naomi Kawase	1992	Japan
Katatsumori	Snail	Naomi Kawase	1994	Japan
Kyakarabaa	Kakarba	Naomi Kawase	2001	Japan
Tarachime		Naomi Kawase	2006	Japan
Ornella Muti
Il Futuro È Donna	The Future Is Woman	Marco Ferreri	1984	Italy
La Dernière Femme	The Last Woman	Marco Ferreri	1976	Italy
Primo Amore	First Love	Dino Risi	1978	Italy
Storie Di Ordinaria Follia	Tales of Ordinary Madness	Marco Ferreri	1981	Italy
Career Leopard – Harry Belafonte
Sing Your Song		Susanne Rostock	2010	USA
Career Leopard – Johnnie To
Dyut Meng Gam	Life Without Principle	Johnnie To	2011	Hong Kong
Hak Se Wui Yi Wo Wai Kwai	Election 2	Johnnie To	2006	Hong Kong
Hak Se Wui	Election	Johnnie To	2005	Hong Kong
PTU		Johnnie To	2003	Hong Kong
Career Leopard – Peter-Christian Fueter
Grounding - Die Letzten Tage Der Swissair	Grounding	Michael Steiner	2006	Switzerland
Renato Pozzetto
Oh, Serafina!		Alberto Lattuada	1976	Italy
Sono Fotogenico	I'm Photogenic	Dino Risi	1980	Italy
Un Amore Su Misura	A Tailor-Made Love	Renato Pozzetto	2007	Italy
Sarah Morris
1972		Sarah Morris	2008	USA
Am/Pm		Sarah Morris	1999	USA
Beijing		Sarah Morris	2008	USA
Capital		Sarah Morris	2000	USA
Chicago		Sarah Morris	2011	USA
Los Angeles		Sarah Morris	2004	USA
Miami		Sarah Morris	2002	USA
Midtown		Sarah Morris	1998	USA
Points On A Line		Sarah Morris	2010	USA
Robert Towne		Sarah Morris	2006	USA
Swiss Cinema Rediscovered
Die Börse Als Barometer Der Wirtschaftslage	The Stock Exchange as a Barometer of the Economic Situation	Hans Richter	1939	Switzerland
Die Neue Wohnung. Version Atelier Richter	The New Apartment. Version Atelier Richter	Hans Richter	1930	Switzerland
Die Neue Wohnung. Version Swb	The New Apartment. Version SWB	Hans Richter	1930	Switzerland
S'Margritli Und D'Soldate. Ernstes Und Heiteres Aus Der Grenzbesetzung	S'Margritli and d'Aldate. Serious and Cheerful from the Border Cast	August Kern	1940	Switzerland

=== Retrospective – Otto Preminger ===
Retrospective Otto Preminger
English Title	Original Title	Director(s)	Year	Production Country
A Royal Scandal		Ernst Lubitsch, Otto Preminger	1945	USA
Advise & Consent		Otto Preminger	1962	USA
Anatomy of a Murder		Otto Preminger	1959	USA
Angel Face		Otto Preminger	1952	USA
Bunny Lake Is Missing		Otto Preminger	1965	USA
Carmen Jones		Otto Preminger	1954	USA
Centennial Summer		Otto Preminger	1946	USA
Daisy Kenyon		Otto Preminger	1947	USA
Danger – Love at Work		Otto Preminger	1937	USA
The Great Love	Die Grosse Liebe	Otto Preminger	1931	Austria
Exodus		Otto Preminger	1960	USA
Fallen Angel		Otto Preminger	1945	USA
Forever Amber		Otto Preminger	1947	USA
Hurry Sundown		Otto Preminger	1967	USA
In Harm's Way		Otto Preminger	1965	USA
In the Meantime, Darling		Otto Preminger	1944	USA
Laura		Otto Preminger	1944	USA
Margin for Error		Otto Preminger	1943	USA
River of No Return		Otto Preminger	1954	USA
Rosebud		Otto Preminger	1975	USA
Saint Joan		Otto Preminger	1957	USA
Skidoo		Otto Preminger	1968	USA
Stalag 17		Billy Wilder	1953	USA
Such Good Friends		Otto Preminger	1971	USA
Tell Me That You Love Me, Junie Moon		Otto Preminger	1970	USA
The 13th Letter		Otto Preminger	1951	USA
The Cardinal		Otto Preminger	1963	USA
The Court-Martial of Billy Mitchell		Otto Preminger	1955	USA
The Fan		Otto Preminger	1949	USA
The Human Factor		Otto Preminger	1979	Great Britain
The Man with the Golden Arm		Otto Preminger	1955	USA
The Moon Is Blue		Otto Preminger	1953	USA
Under Your Spell		Otto Preminger	1936	USA
Where the Sidewalk Ends		Otto Preminger	1950	USA
Whirlpool		Otto Preminger	1949	USA

=== Author's Shorts (Corti d'Autore) ===
Original Title	English Title	Director(s)	Production Country
Dizem Que Os Cães Veem Coisas	They Say Dogs See Things	Guto Parente	Brazil
Family Nightmare		Dustin Defa	USA
Ina Litovski		Anaïs Barbeau-Lavalette, André Turpin	Canada
La Madre	The Mother	Jean-Marie Straub	Switzerland
O Dom Das Lágrimas	The Gift of Tears	João Nicolau	Portugal
Pohn Talay		Wichanon Somumjarn, Anocha Suwichakornpong	Thailand

=== Special Premiere ===
Special Premiere: Arnon Milchan
English Title	Original Title	Director(s)	Year	Production Country
Brazil		Terry Gilliam	1985	Great Britain
L.A. Confidential		Curtis Hanson	1997	USA
Once Upon a Time in America		Sergio Leone	1984	USA
The King of Comedy		Martin Scorsese	1983	USA

=== Jury Members' Films ===
Filmmakers of the Present Jury
Original Title	English Title	Director(s)	Year	Production Country
Daratt		Mahamat-Saleh Haroun	2006	Chad
Impolex		Alex Ross Perry	2009	USA
Open Verdict		Yuhang Ho	2011	Hong Kong
Transe	Trance	Teresa Villaverde	2006	Portugal
Main Competition Jury
Killing Zoe		Roger Avary	1993	France
La Vie Ne Me Fait Pas Peur	Life Doesn't Scare Me	Noémie Lvovsky	2004	France
Mekong Hotel		Apichatpong Weerasethakul	2012	Great Britain
The President'S Last Bang		Im Sang-Soo	2005	South Korea
The Rules of Attraction		Roger Avary	2002	USA
Leopards of Tomorrow Jury
La Ménagerie De Betty		Isabelle Mayor	2010	Switzerland
La Peur, Petit Chasseur	Fear, Little Hunter	Laurent Achard	2003	France
Le Dernier Des Fous	The Last of the Madmen	Laurent Achard	2006	France
Les Cheveux Courts, Ronde, Petite Taille	Short, Round, Small Hair	Robin Harsch	2012	Switzerland
O Som Ao Redor	The Sound Around	Kleber Mendonça Filho	2012	Brazil
The Last Emperor		Bernardo Bertolucci	1987	China
The Passenger		Michelangelo Antonioni	1975	Italy

=== Special Prizes ===
Gael García Bernal
English title	Original title	Director(s)	Year	Production country
Bad Education	La Mala Educación	Pedro Almodóvar	2004	Spain
The Science of Sleep	La Science Des Rêves	Michel Gondry	2006	France
Charlotte Rampling
The Night Porter	Il Portiere Di Notte	Liliana Cavani	1974	Italy
Under the Sand	Sous Le Sable	François Ozon	2000	France
Leos Carax
Boy Meets Girl		Leos Carax	1984	France
Holy Motors		Leos Carax	2012	France
The Lovers on the Bridge	Les Amants Du Pont-Neuf	Leos Carax	1991	France
Mauvais Sang		Leos Carax	1986	France
Pola X		Leos Carax	1999	France
Tokyo!		Bong Joon Ho, Leos Carax, Michel Gondry	2008	France

== Independent Sections ==
=== Critics Week ===
The Semaine de la Critique is an independent section, created in 1990 by the Swiss Association of Film Journalists in partnership with the Locarno Film Festival.

Original Title	English Title	Director(s)	Year	Production Country
Camp 14 - Total Control Zone		Marc Wiese	2012	Germany
Dance Of Outlaws		Mohamed El Aboudi	2012	Finland
Libya Hurra		Fritz Ofner	2012	Austria
Mother's Day		Bin Chuen Choi	2012	Germany
Sagrada - El Misteri De La Creació	Sacred - The Mystery of Creation	Stefan Haupt	2012	Switzerland
Stolen Seas	The Chair Seas	Thymaya Payne	2011	USA
Vergiss Mein Nicht	Don't Forget Mine	David Sieveking	2012	Germany

=== Appellation Swiss ===
Original Title	English Title	Director(s)	Year	Production Country
Bon Voyage	Have a Good Trip	Fabio Friedli	2011	Switzerland
Capitaine Thomas Sankara	Captain Thomas Sankara	Christophe Cupelin	2012	Switzerland
Carole Roussopoulos, Une Femme À La Caméra	Carole Roussopoulos, a Woman on the Camera	Emmanuelle de Riedmatten	2011	Switzerland
Die Kinder Vom Napf	The Children from the Bowl	Alice Schmid	2011	Switzerland
Die Wiesenberger		Martin Schilt, Bernard Weber	2012	Switzerland
Dur D'Être Dieu	Hard to be God	Antoine Cattin, Pavel Kostomarov	2012	Switzerland
Giochi D'Estate	Summer Games	Rolando Colla	2011	Switzerland
Gypaetus Helveticus		Marcel Barelli	2011	Switzerland
Hiver Nomade	Nomad Winter	Manuel von Stürler	2012	Switzerland
L'Enfant D'En Haut	Sister	Ursula Meier	2012	Switzerland
Mary & Johnny		Julian M. Grünthal, Samuel Schwarz	2011	Switzerland
Opération Libertad	Operation Libertad	Nicolas Wadimoff	2011	Switzerland
Os Vivos Tambem Choram	The Living also Cry	Basil Da Cunha	2012	Switzerland
Virgin Tales		Mirjam von Arx	2012	Switzerland

== Official Awards ==
=== International Competition (Concorso Internazionale) ===
- Golden Leopard (Pardo d'oro): The Girl from Nowhere directed by Jean-Claude Brisseau
- Special Jury Prize : Somebody Up There Likes Me directed by Robert Byington
- Leopard for Best Director: Liang Ying for the film Wo Hai You Hua Yao Shuo (When Night Falls)
- Leopard for Best Actress: An Nai in Wo Hai You Hua Yao Shuo (When Night Falls) directed by Ying Liang
- Leopard for Best Actor: Walter Saabel in Der Glanz Des Tages directed by Rainer Frimmel, Tizza Covi
- Special Mention: A Última Vez Que Vi Mancau directed by João Rui Guerra da Mata, João Pedro Rodrigues

=== Filmmakers of the Present Competition (Concorso Cineasti del presente) ===
- Pardo d'oro Cineasti del presente – Premio George Foundation: Inori directed by Pedro Gonzáles-Rubio
- Premio per il miglior regista emergente (Award for Best New Director): Joel Potrykus for the film Ape
- Premio special della giuria Ciné+ Cineasti del presente: Not In Tel Aviv directed by Nony Geffen
- Special Mention (Concorso Cineasti del presente): Tectonics directed by Peter Bo Rappmund

=== First Work ===
- Pardo per la miglior opera prima (Leopard for best first work): Ji Yi Wang Zhe Wo directed by Fang Song

=== Leopards of Tomorrow - Pardi di domani ===
==== Leopards of Tomorrow - International Competition ====
- Golden Leopard for Best International Short Film: The Mass Of Men directed by Gabriel Gauchet
- Silver Leopard (Concorso internazionale): Yadermi Wydhody directed by Myroslav Slaboshpytskyi
- Special Mention (Pardi di domani – Concorso internazionale): Los Retratos directed by Iván D. Gaona
- Locarno Nomination for the European Film Awards – Premio Pianifica: Back Of Beyond directed by Michael Lennox
- Award for Subtitling (Premio Film und Video Untertitelung): O Que Arde Cura directed by João Rui Guerra da Mata

==== Leopards of Tomorrow - National Competition ====
- Golden Leopard for Best National Short Film:: Radio-Actif directed by Nathan Hofstetter
- Silver Leopard (Concorso nazionale): L'Amour bègue (Stammering Love) directed by Jan Czarlewski
- Premio Action Light per la miglior speranza svizzera: Il Vulcano directed by Alice Riva

=== Piazza Grande ===
- Prix du Public UBS: Lore directed by Cate Shortland
- Variety Piazza Grande Award: Camille Redouble directed by Noémie Lvovsky

=== Youth Jury (Giuria dei giovani) ===
==== Youth Jury – Main Competition (Concorso internazionale) ====
- First Prize: Starlet directed by Sean Baker
- Second Prize: Mobile Home directed by François Pirot
- Third Prize: Compliance directed by Craig Zobel
- Premio "L'ambiente è qualità di vita": The End Of Time directed by Peter Mettler
- Special Mention: Berberian Sound Studio directed by Peter Strickland, Image Problem directed by Andreas Pfiffner, Simon Baumann

==== Youth Jury – Filmmakers of the Present Competition ====
- Youth Jury Prize – Filmmakers of the Present: Boa Sorte, Meu Amor directed by Daniel Aragão

==== Youth Jury – Leopards of Tomorrow ====
- Youth Jury Prize – Pardi di domani (Concorso internazionale): Back Of Beyond directed by Michael Lennox
- Youth Jury Prize – Pardi di domani (Concorso nazionale): L'Amour BÈGue directed by Jan Czarlewski
- Special Mention – Pardi di domani: Serce Do Walki

=== Giuria SRG SSR idée suisse / Semaine de la critique 2012 ===
- Premio Zonta Club Locarno: Dance Of Outlaws directed by Mohamed El Aboudi
- Premio SRG SSR / Semaine de la critique: Vergiss Mein Nicht directed by David Sieveking

=== Ecumenical Jury ===
- Ecumenical Prize: Une Esonienne À Paris directed by Ilmar Raag
- Special Mention (Giuria Ecumenica): Der Glanz Des Tages (The Shine of Day) directed by Rainer Frimmel, Tizza Covi

=== FIPRESCI Jury ===
- International Critics' Award, FIPRESCI Prize: Leviathan directed by Verena Paravel, Lucien Castaing-Taylor

=== CICAE Jury ===
- Art Cinema Award: Museum Hours directed by Jem Cohen

=== FICC/IFFS Jury ===
- Premio Don Quijote: Der Glanz Des Tages directed by Rainer Frimmel e Tizza Covi
- Special Mention (Giuria FICC/IFFS): Leviathan directed by Verena Paravel e Lucien Castaing-Taylor
