= 2014 Sophia Awards =

2nd Sophia Awards
- Date: October 8, 2014
- Site: São Carlos National Theatre, Lisbon, Portugal

Highlights
- Best Picture: A Última Vez que Vi Macau
- Most awards: Até Amanhã Camaradas (4)
- Most nominations: Até Amanhã Camaradas (15)

The 2014 Sophia Awards (Portuguese: Prémios Sophia 2014) were the 2014 edition of the Sophia Awards, an award presented by the Portuguese Academy of Cinema to award the best in Portuguese filmmaking. The nominees were announced on September 9 and the award ceremony took place on October 8, 2014 at the Centro Cultural de Belém in Lisbon.

== Winners and nominees ==
=== Awards ===
Winners are listed first and highlighted in boldface.

Best Film	Best Director
**A Última Vez que Vi Macau**; Até Amanhã Camaradas; Night Train to Lisbon; É o Amor; Quarta Divisão	**Joaquim Leitão – Até Amanhã Camaradas**; Joaquim Leitão – Quarta Divisão; João Canijo – É o Amor; João Pedro Rodrigues and João Rui Guerra da Mata – A Última Vez que Vi Macau
Best Leading Actor	Best Leading Actress
**Pedro Hestnes – Em Segunda Mão**; Cândido Ferreira – Até Amanha Camaradas; Gonçalo Waddington – Até Amanha Camaradas; João Lagarto – Bairro	**Rita Durão – Em Segunda Mão**; Carla Chambel – Quarta Divisão; Leonor Seixas – Até Amanhã Camaradas; Maria João Bastos – Bairro
Best Supporting Actor	Best Supporting Actress
**Adriano Luz – Até Amanhã Camaradas**; Adriano Carvalho – Até Amanhã Camaradas; Adriano Luz – Night Train to Lisbon; Afonso Pimentel – Bairro; Carloto Cotta – Bairro; Marco D'Almeida – Night Train to Lisbon	**Beatriz Batarda – Night Train to Lisbon**; Carla Chambel – Até Amanhã Camaradas; Joana de Verona – Em Segunda Mão; Julie Sergeant – Bairro
Best Original Screenplay	Best Cinematography
**João Pedro Rodrigues and João Rui Guerra da Mata – A Última Vez que Vi Macau**; António Pedro Figueiredo and Catarina Ruivo – Em Segunda Mão; Leonardo António – O Frágil Som do Meu Motor; João Canijo and Anabela Moreira – É o Amor	**Rui Poças – A Última Vez que Vi Macau**; Carlos Lopes (A.I.P) – Quarta Divisão; José António Loureiro – Até Amanhã Camaradas; Mário Castanheira and Tiago Carvalho – É o Amor
Best Artistic Direction	Best Sound
**Augusto Mayer – Night Train to Lisbon**; Isabel Branco and Paula Szabo – Em Segunda Mão; João Martins – Até Amanhã Camaradas; João Rui Guerra da Mata – A Última Vez que Vi Macau	**Carlos Alberto Lopes and Branko Neskov – Até Amanhã, Camaradas**; Carlos Alberto Lopes, Branko Neskov (C.A.S), Elsa Ferreira and Pedro Melo – Quarta Divisão; Pedro Vieira, Pedro Melo, Filipe Sambado, Ricardo Leal, Amélia Sarmento, Luís Bicudo and Paulo Abelho, João Eleutério – O Frágil Som do Meu Motor; Vasco Pedroso and Branko Neskov – RPG
Best Wardrobe	Best Makeup and Hairstyling
**Maria Gonzaga and Maria Amaral – Até Amanhã, Camaradas**; Ana Simão – Em Segunda Mão; Silvia Grabovwsky – 7 Pecados Rurais; Teresa Alves – Bairro	**Sano de Perpessac – Night Train to Lisbon**; Abigail Machado – A Republica di Mininus; Rute Alves – RPG; Cláudia Ferreira, João Rapaz, Sara Menitra and Helena Baptista – O Frágil Som do Meu Motor; Magali Santana – 7 Pecados Rurais; Sano de Perpessac – Em Segunda Mão; Susana Correia and Ana Ferreira – Até Amanhã Camaradas
Best Music	Best Editing
**Rodrigo Leão – O Frágil Som do Meu Motor**; João Marco – Além de ti; As Mercenárias, Mentis afro (Boss) and Primeiro G – Um Fim do Mundo; Luís Cília – Até Amanhã Camaradas	**João Bráz – É o Amor**; Pedro Ribeiro – Até Amanhã Camaradas; Pedro Ribeiro – Quarta Divisão; Miguel Costa, Gonçalo Frederico, Paulo Pinto – Bairro; João Pedro Rodrigues and João Rui Guerra da Mata – A Última Vez que Vi Macau
Best Documentary – Feature	Best Fiction Short Film
**A Batalha de Tabatô – João Viana**; Ophiussa - Uma Cidade de Fernando Pessoa – Fernando Carrilho; Terra de Ninguém – Salomé Lamas	**Luminita – André Marques**; Longe do Éden – Carlos Amaral; Lápis Azul – Rafael Antunes; Gambozinos – João Nicolau
Best Documentary – Short	Best Animated Short Film
**Lápis Azul – Rafael Antunes**; Almas Censuradas – Bruno Ganhão; A Máquina – Mafalda Marques; Casa Manuel Vieira – Júlio Alves; Fontelonga – Luís Costa	**Alda – Ana Cardoso, Luís Catalo, Filipe Fonseca and Liliana Sobreiro**; Carrotrope – Paulo D’Alva; Outro Homem Qualquer – Luís Soares; Ptolmus – Josemaria RRA; Brincar – Coletivo Fotograma 24 e Coletivo de Crianças, jovens e idosos de Guimarães

==== Career Awards ====
- José Fonseca e Costa
- Henrique Espírito Santo
- Eduardo Serra

=== Films with multiple nominations and awards ===
The following 10 films received multiple nominations:

Nominations	Film
15	Até Amanhã Camaradas
7	Bairro
7	Em Segunda Mão
6	Night Train to Lisbon
6	Quarta Divisão
6	A Última Vez que Vi Macau
5	É o Amor
4	O Frágil Som do Meu Motor
2	7 Pecados Rurais
2	RPG

The following 4 films received multiple awards:

Awards	Film
4	Até Amanhã Camaradas
3	Night Train to Lisbon
3	A Última Vez que Vi Macau
2	Em Segunda Mão
