= 2014 Prémio Autores =

The 2014 Prémio Autores was the fifth edition of the Prémio Autores. It took place on 8 May 2014 at the Salão Nobre dos Paços do Concelho of the Câmara Municipal of Lisbon, Portugal.

== Winners and nominees ==
Winners are listed first and highlighted in boldface.

=== Visual arts ===
- Best Photographic Work
  - **Rei Capitão Soldado Ladrão, by Jorge Molder**
  - Andar, abraçar, by Helena Almeida
  - Time Machine, by Edgar Martins
- Best Plastic Arts Exhibition
  - **A Substância do Tempo, by Jorge Martins**
  - Arte Vida/Vida Arte, by Alberto Carneiro
  - Palácio Nacional da Ajuda, by Joana Vasconcelos
- Best Scenographic Work
  - **O Preço, by António Casimiro and João Lourenço**
  - A Noite, by Ana Paula Rocha
  - Waiting for Godot, by João Mendes Ribeiro

=== Dance ===
- Best Choreography
  - **Salto, by André Mesquita**
  - Abstand, by Luís Marrafa and António Cabrita
  - Fica no Singelo, by Clara Andermatt

=== Film ===
- Best Actor
  - **Gonçalo Waddington (Até Amanhã, Camaradas)**
  - Rui Morisson (Photo)
  - Pedro Hestnes (Em Segunda Mão)
- Best Actress
  - **Maria João Bastos (Bairro)**
  - Anabela Moreira (É o Amor (Obrigação))
  - Carla Chambel (Quarta Divisão)
- Best Film
  - **A Última Vez Que Vi Macau, by João Pedro Rodrigues and João Rui Guerra da Mata**
  - É o Amor (Obrigação), by João Canijo
  - Em Segunda Mão, by Catarina Ruivo
- Best Screenplay
  - **Luís Filipe Rocha (Até Amanhã, Camaradas)**
  - Carlos Saboga (Photo)
  - Catarina Ruivo and António Pedro Figueiredo (Em Segunda Mão)

=== Literature ===
- Best Children's and Juvenile Book
  - **O Senhor Pina, written by Álvaro Magalhães, illustrated by Luiz Darocha**
  - Irmão Lobo, written by Carla Maia de Almeida, illustrated by António Jorge Gonçalves
  - O Rei Vai à Caça, written by Adélia Carvalho, illustrated by Marta Madureira
- Best Narrative Fiction Book
  - **Para Onde Vão os Guarda-Chuvas, by Afonso Cruz**
  - A Rocha Branca, by Fernando Campos
  - No Labirinto de Centauro, by Rui Vieira
- Best Poetry Book
  - **Gaveta do Fundo, by A. M. Pires Cabral**
  - A Fome Apátrida das Aves, by Francisco Duarte Mangas
  - Instituto de Antropologia, by Jorge Reis-Sá

=== Music ===
- Best Album
  - **Almost Visible Orchestra, by Noiserv**
  - As Viúvas Não Temem a Morte, by Ciclo Preparatório
  - Gisela João, by Gisela João
- Best Erudite Music Work
  - **Magnificat, by António Pinho Vargas**
  - Fanfarra Ciclópica, by Luís Cardoso
  - Livro de Florbela, by Nuno Côrte-Real
- Best Song
  - **"Lenço Enxuto", by Samuel Úria**
  - "Gosto de me Drogar", by JP Simões
  - "How I Feel", by João Vieira

=== Radio ===
- Best Radio Program
  - **5 Minutos de Jazz, by José Duarte (Antena 1)**
  - Em Sintonia, by António Cartaxo (Antena 2)
  - Programa da Manhã, by Pedro Ribeiro and team (Rádio Comercial)

=== Television ===
- Best Entertainment Program
  - **Odisseia, by Gonçalo Waddington, Bruno Nogueira and Tiago Guedes, directed by Tiago Guedes (RTP)**
  - Conta-me História, by Luís Filipe Borges (RTP)
  - Música Maestro, by Rui Massena (RTP)
- Best Fiction Program
  - **Linhas de Torres, by Carlos Saboga, directed by Valeria Sarmiento (RTP)**
  - Belmonte, adapted by Artur Ribeiro with Cláudia Sampaio, Elisabete Moreira, Joana Pereira da Silva, Nuno Duarte, Simone Pereira, directed by António Borges Correia, Jorge Humberto Carvalho, Jorge Queiroga and Nuno Franco (TVI)
  - Uma Família Açoriana, by João Nunes, directed by João Cayatte (RTP)
- Best Information Program
  - **Travessia no Deserto, by Mafalda Gameiro (RTP)**
  - A Prova, by Sofia Pinto Coelho (SIC)
  - Quadratura do Círculo (SIC Notícias)

=== Theatre ===
- Best Actor
  - **João Perry (O Preço)**
  - Elmano Sancho (O Campeão do Mundo Ocidental)
  - Miguel Borges (Yerma)
- Best Actress
  - **Flávia Gusmão (As Centenárias)**
  - Maria João Pinho (O Campeão do Mundo Ocidental)
  - Maya Booth (Actor Imperfeito)
- Best Performed Portuguese Text
  - **Sabe Deus Pintar o Diabo, by Abel Neves**
  - Coragem Hoje, Abraços Amanhã, by Joana Brandão
  - Finge, by Carlos J.Pessoa
- Best Show
  - **Yerma, by João Garcia Miguel**
  - O Preço, by João Lourenço
  - 4 AD HOC, by Luís Miguel Cintra
