= 2007 Golden Globes (Portugal) =

Annual Portuguese awards ceremony

The 2007 Golden Globes (Portugal) were the 12th edition of the Golden Globes (Portugal). It was held on 1 April 2007 in Praça de Touros do Campo Pequeno, and broadcast by SIC and presented by Bárbara Guimarães.

== Winners and nominees ==
- Cinema:
  - Best Film: Coisa Ruim, with Tiago Guedes, Frederico Serra and Paulo Branco
  - nominated: 98 Octanas, with Fernando Lopes
  - nominated: Transe, with Teresa Villaverde
  - nominated: Viúva Rica Solteira Não Fica, with José Fonseca e Costa
  - Best Actor: José Afonso Pimentel, in Coisa Ruim
  - nominated: José Pedro Gomes, in Filme da Treta
  - nominated: Marco d'Almeida, in 20,13
  - nominated: Rogério Samora, in 98 Octanas
  - Best Actress: Isabel Ruth, in Vanitas
  - nominated: Ana Moreira, in Transe
  - nominated: Carla Chambel, in 98 Octanas
  - nominated: Manuela Couto, in Coisa Ruim
- Theatre:
  - Best Play: Music no Coração, a script by Filipe La Féria at Theatre Politeama
  - Best Actress: Maria do Céu Guerra (Todos os que Caem, by Samuel Beckett, enc. João Mota, at Theatre da Comuna)
  - Best Actor: João Lagarto (Começar a Acabar, de Samuel Beckett, enc. João Lagarto, at Theatre Nacional D. Maria II)
- Television:
  - Best Kiss: Luciana Abreu e Diogo Amaral (Floribella)
  - Best Hero: Fátima Lopes (Fátima)
  - Best Villain: Mafalda Vilhena (Floribella)
- Fashion:
  - Best Stylist: Miguel Vieira
  - Best Male Model: Nuno Lopes
  - Best Female Model: Elsa
- Music:
  - Best Individual Performer: Sérgio Godinho
  - Best Group: The Gift
- Sports:
  - Best Sportsperson: Vanessa Fernandes (Triathlon)
  - Best Coach: José Mourinho
  - Best Football Player: Cristiano Ronaldo
- Award of Merit and Excellence:
  - Herman José
