= 2007 Golden Globes =

2007 Golden Globes may refer to:

- 64th Golden Globe Awards, the Golden Globe Awards ceremony that took place in 2007
- 65th Golden Globe Awards, the cancelled 2008 ceremony honoring the best in film and television for 2007
- 2007 Golden Globes (Portugal)
