= Joachim Leilich =

Philosophy professor

Joachim Leilich (born 1949) is an emeritus professor of philosophy at the University of Antwerp, of German origin, who formerly held positions as a tutor and student-assistant at the university of Frankfurt. His main research topics are analytical philosophy, phenomenal consciousness, Ludwig Wittgenstein, and freedom of the will. He obtained his PhD under supervision of Karl-Otto Apel in Frankfurt.

== Academic career ==
Leilich studied philosophy, linguistics and catholic theology at the Goethe University Frankfurt where, in 1982, he was awarded his doctoral degree in philosophy for his thesis Ludwig Wittgenstein entitled "The Autonomy of Language" (German: Die Autonomie der Sprache), a study about the late philosophy of Wittgenstein.

Since 1979 he was affiliated with the University of Antwerp, where he became a professor of philosophy, chairman of the department of philosophy, as well as chairman of the working group of philosophical psychology. He was also a founding member of the "Institute of Jewish Studies (IJS)" (Dutch: Instituut voor Joodse Studies) at the mentioned university. He also became a member of the board of directors of the same IJS.

Amongst the courses which Leilich taught at the University of Antwerp are "Contemporary Analytical Philosophy", "Philosophy of Language", "Logic" and "Epistemology and Philosophy of Science". Leilich was noted for his unusual method of stepwise grading during exams.

In 2014, Leilich became an emeritus professor at the University of Antwerp. On 22 May 2014, he held his emeritus lecture about the Jewish roots of the philosopher Ludwig Wittgenstein.

== Philosophy ==
By September 2004 he had published around thirty articles; primarily about language (analytical) philosophy, in particular in relation to Wittgenstein, and about philosophy of mind. Many of his publications focus on the problem of the free will.

Leilich has dealt with the question of the rationality of pragmatic explanatory frameworks for the use of words. As such, he discovered that this ability for humans to justify the use of language, with regards to its normative aspect, is a fundamental expression of human reasonableness.

Leilich has argued that nature is neither evil nor good, since moral proclamations require the involvement of mind to be appropriate.

He has also been noted for making practical assertions as to what philosophy can mean to society, drawing upon the ideas of Peter Bieri, and has reflected upon the arising of new branches of science during popularizing lecture series.

Further more he has investigated the mental processing of sensory stimuli.

== Bibliography ==
=== Articles ===
- Joachim Leilich, "Hoe irrationeel zijn libertariërs? Peter Bierl over de vrije wil", Filosofie: tweemaandelijks tijdschrift van de Stichting Informatie Filosofie 21 (2), Stichting Informatie Filosofie, 2011, pp. 9–14, ISSN 0925-9449.
- Joachim Leilich, "Analytische filosofie op Vlaamse wijze: tussen taalanalyse en naturalisme", De uil van Minerva: tijdschrift voor geschiedenis en wijsbegeerte van de cultuur 24 (3), 2011, p. 135-144, ISSN 0772-4381.

=== Books ===
- Die Autonomie der Sprache. Ein Grundgedanke Wittgensteins, München: Profil-Verlag, 1983, ISBN 9783890190976.

=== Book chapters ===
- "Begriffe, Regeln und sprachliche Praxis. Überlegungen zu Wittgenstein", in: Axel Wüstehube (ed.), Pragmatische Rationalitätstheorien. Studies in Pragmatism, Idealism, and Philosophy of Mind, Würzburg: Königshausen & Neumann, 1995, pp. 269–292, ISBN 9783884799901.
- "Free Will and Moral Necessity in Mendelssohn", in: Reinier Munk (ed.), Moses Mendelssohn's Metaphysics and Aesthetics, Dordrecht: Springer, 2011, pp. 245–258, ISBN 978-94-007-2450-1.
- "Universal and transcendental pragmatics", in: Marina Sbisà & Jan-Ola Östman & Jef Verschueren (eds.), Philosophical Perspectives for Pragmatics, Philosophical Perspectives for Pragmatics 10, Amsterdam: John Benjamins Publishing Company, 2011, pp. 289–292, ISBN 978-90-272-0787-6.

=== Compilations ===
Leilich compiled a collection of letters by Ludwig Wittgenstein, translated by Hans Driessen. The compilation of 244 letters, spanning Wittgenstein's life from when he started studying philosophy at the University of Cambridge until his death in 1951, also contains comments by Leilich.

- Joachim Leilich & Hans Driessen, Ludwig Wittgenstein: brieven, Amsterdam: Wereldbibliotheek, 2000, 254 p., ISBN 90-284-1852-0.

=== Editor ===
- Jaochim Leilich (ed.) & Jean Verhaeghe & Geert van Eekert & Erik Oger & Peter Reynaert, Immanuel Kant. Een inleiding, Kapellen: Pelckmans, 1994, 195 p., ISBN 9789028934795.
- Joachim Leilich & Peter Reynaert & Johan Veldeman (eds.), Het bewustzijn in de fysische wereld: filosofische essays over materialisme en fenomenaal bewustzijn, Leuven: Peeters, 2002, vi + 306 p., ISBN 978-90-429-1189-5.
