= O Fim do Mundo =

O Fim do Mundo may refer to:

- The End of the World (1992 film), a Portuguese drama film
- O Fim do Mundo (TV series), a Brazilian telenovela
