= Alexandra Lencastre =

Portuguese actress

- Born: Maria Alexandra de Alencastre Telo Teodósio Pedrosa; September 26, 1965 (age 61); Lisbon, Portugal
- Occupation: Actress
- Years active: 1986-present

Alexandra Lencastre (born Maria Alexandra de Alencastre Telo Teodósio Pedrosa on September 26, 1965) is a Portuguese actress.

== Career ==
Lencastre was born in Lisbon. She left the Course of Philosophy at the Faculty of Arts of Lisbon to join the Lisbon Theatre and Film School (Escola Superior de Teatro e Cinema), where she graduated in Theatre (Actors Training) (1986). Win projection when working with Jorge Listopad the play Frei Luís de Sousa, Almeida Garrett (Actress Award Revelation, by APCT, 1986). Since then she collaborated with other directors such as Mario Feliciano, Orlando Neves, Carlos Avilez, Gaston Cruz, José Wallenstein, Rogério de Carvalho and John Lawrence, who directed her in his last theatrical experience, Fernando Krapp wrote me this letter from Dorst Tanked (1997). She became one of the most popular actresses on Portuguese television. She began to appear in the Portuguese version of the children's television series Sesame Street (1990), then she moved on to soap operas and series such as The People's Banker (1993), Cabaret (1994), Dear Teacher (2000), Rage to Live (2002), Hannah and the Seven (2003) (Golden Globe for Best Actress for TV, 2003), or more recently, Time to Live (2006) and Nobody else Tu (2005), where their presence earned high levels of audiences. Also for television, presented some programs, such as the controversial In Bed With... (1993).

In the film stood out in the feature films of Fernando Lopes, The Dolphin (2002) (Golden Globe for Best Film Actress) and Out There (2004), which paired with Rogério Samora. He also starred in The Woman Who Believed U.S. President (2003), John Botelho. It was directed by other filmmakers, such as Teresa Villaverde, João Mário Grilo, António Pedro Vasconcelos, Joao Cesar Monteiro, John Canijo Leonel Vieira and Manuel Mozos.

Daughter of Theodosius Gouveia Jacinto Pedrosa, Coimbra, military, and his wife Maria Pestana de Adalgisa Alencastre Telo, Madeira, has an older brother of Pedro de Alencastre Telo Teodósio Pedrosa, born in 1964. She was married to actor Virgílio Castelo and the Dutch television producer Piet-Hein Bakker, between January 18, 1996, and 2003, the last marriage two children: Margaret (10 October 1996) and Catherine (1998). Another curiosity is that she is half-sister of journalist Ana Paula Ribeiro (born 1965 daughter of his father's relationship with Maria Idalina Ribeiro) and second cousin of the writer Inês Pedrosa.

In April 2007, The Biography Channel aired a biographical documentary on Alexandra Lencastre.

== Television ==
- On Thin Ice - Fernanda Sequeira Lobo
- The Gypsy Heiress - Caetana Rivera
- The Only Woman - Pilar Sacramento
- Crossed Destinies - Laura Veiga de Andrade / Sílvia Moreira
- My Angel - Rita Joana Saraiva
- My Love - Patricia Castro Mota
- Conversation Rear - Presenter
- Ecuador - Maria Augusta Trinity (Main Cast)
- fascination - Ventura Margarida Miranda
- Time to Live - Fatima Almeida
- Nobody like you - Luiza Albuquerque
- and the Seven Ana - Ana Cruz
- Rage to Live - Beatriz Lacerda Cabral
- Dear Professor - Helena
- Are not Man, are nothing - Victoria Palma Reis
- Risks - Lydia
- All the sauce and Faith In God - Eggy (co-star)
- Forgive me - Presenter
- In bed with ... - Presenter
- The People's Banker - Elizabeth (Main Cast)
- Icarus
- The Best Years - Daisy
- Sesame Street - Guiomar
- A Herdeira - Caetana Rivera

== Cinema ==
- Corrupção 2007
- O Julgamento 2007
- Lá Fora 2004
- A mulher que acreditava ser Presidente dos EUA 2003
- Os Imortais 2003
- A Falha 2003
- The Dancer Upstairs 2002
- O Delfim 2002
- Um Passeio No Parque 2000
- Os Mutantes 1998
- Traffic 1998
- Três Palmeiras 1994
- O Oiro do Bandido 1994
- O Fim do Mundo A Terra 1992
- Requiem para um Narciso 1992
- Xavier 1992
- O Medo 1992
- Entre Mortos e Vivos 1992
- Erros Meus 1991
- Filha da Mãe 1989
- Conversa Acabada
- Zénite
- A Última Viagem
- Meia Noite
- Quatro x Quatro

== Theater ==
- Fernando Krapp Escreveu-me Esta Carta (1997)
- O Tempo e o Quarto (1993)
- Os Homens
- A Gaivota
- Estrelas da Manhã
- Terminal Bar
- Cenas da Vida de Benilde
- Quem Pode, Pode
- Lisístrata (1989)
- Erros Meus, Má Fortuna, Amor Ardente
- D. João no Jardim das Delícias (1988)
- O Pranto e as Almas
- Opereta (1988)
- O Balcão (1987)
- Tartufo (1987)
- O Indesejado
- Frei Luís de Sousa
- Pílades
