= Mahshid =

Mahshid (Persian: مهشید, mahshīd or mahsheed, from mah [moon] + shīd [sun]; "moon & sun") is a Persian given name for females. Mahshid also translates moon and sun ("mah" + "(khor)shid"). People named Mahshid include:

- Mahshid Amirshahi (born 1937), Iranian writer
- Mahshid Mirmoezzi (born 1962), Iranian translator from German into Persian
- Mahshid Moshiri (born 1951), Iranian novelist
