= The Girl from Nowhere =

The Girl from Nowhere may refer to:

- The Girl from Nowhere (1919 film), an American silent film
- The Girl from Nowhere (1921 film), an American silent film
- The Girl from Nowhere (2012 film), a French film

== See also ==
- Girl from Nowhere, a Thai television series
