= Cigano =

Cigano (plural ciganos), a Portuguese name for the Romani people, may refer to:

- Romani people in Portugal
- Romani people in Brazil
- Junior dos Santos (born 1984), nicknamed "Cigano", a Brazilian mixed martial artist
- Cigano (film), a 2013 Portuguese film
