= Adelaide João =

Portuguese actress (1921–2021)

- Born: Maria da Glória Pereira da Silva; 27 July 1921; Lisbon, Portugal
- Died: 3 February 2021 (aged 99); Lisbon, Portugal
- Occupation: Actress
- Years active: 1960–2021

Adelaide João (27 July 1921 – 3 February 2021), born Maria da Glória Pereira da Silva, was a Portuguese actress.

== Career ==
In a career that spanned 60 years she appeared in more than 135 films and television shows starting 1960. She starred in The End of the World, which was screened in the Un Certain Regard section at the 1993 Cannes Film Festival.

She won the Career Awards at the Sophia Awards in 2018. At the time of her death she was living in Casa do Artista, and was reportedly infected with COVID-19 during the pandemic in Portugal.

== Selected filmography ==
- The End of the World (1992)
