= Carla Chambel =

Portuguese actress

- Occupation: Actress

Carla Chambel is a Portuguese actress.

== Filmography ==
- Mal (1999)
- 98 Octanas (2006)
- Amália (2008)
- Operação Outono (2012)
- Quarta Divisão (2013)
- Bem-Vindos a Beirais (TV, 2013 – 2016)

== Awards and nominations ==
Award	Year	Nominated work	Category	Result
Globos de Ouro	2007	98 Octanas	Best Actress	Nominated
Sophia Awards	2013	Operação Outono	Best Supporting Actress	Nominated
Prémio Autores	2014	Quarta Divisão	Best Actress	Nominated
