= David Bonneville =

Portuguese film director (born 1978)

- Born: 1978 (age 47–48); Porto, Portugal
- Education: University of Westminster (MA); Deutsche Film- und Fernsehakademie Berlin (Directing Diploma); Catholic University of Portugal; Pompeu Fabra University
- Occupations: Film director, screenwriter
- Years active: 2004–present
- Notable work: The Last Bath, Cigano, Heiko

David Bonneville (born in 1978) is a film director and screenwriter of French and British descent.

== Education and background ==
Bonneville received the University of Westminster academic Excellence scholarship for his MA in Screenwriting & Producing. He holds a Deutsche Film- und Fernsehakademie Berlin Directing Diploma in the context of the Gulbenkian Foundation Arts Programme. Bonneville has also completed a BA (Hons) Sound & Image (first class degree), having studied at the Catholic University of Portugal and the Pompeu Fabra University. Bonneville speaks six languages: Portuguese, Spanish, and English fluently, also French, elementary Italian and Catalan.

Bonneville has been a workshop leader, mentor and lecturer at the Masaryk University, The Actors Centre, University of Westminster, ETIC School of Innovation and Creation Technologies, ACT School for Actors, and several other structures.

Bonneville began his career with the role of assistant to Douglas Gordon and Manoel de Oliveira. He has also worked at the BBC.

== Films ==
Heiko (Best Short Film at the 24th Mix:Copenhagen Film Festival/Denmark and Special Mention at the 10th Slamdance Film Festival/Park City, Utah, USA) is commercially distributed in the UK by Peccadillo Pictures. Heiko has screened at more than 70 festivals worldwide, taking Bonneville to the 58th Berlin Film Festival.

L'Arc-en-Ciel (Best Actress Award at the International Portuguese Language Film Festival) premiered at Fantasporto and was funded by the Gulbenkian Foundation and the RTP.

Cigano aka 'Gypsy' (Golden Palm in Mexico; Golden Cat in Izmir; Elche Best Fiction Award in Spain; etc.) was funded by the Portuguese Film Board and premiered at the Locarno International Film Festival. It was a SXSW and Hamptons Film Festival nominee.

The Last Bath is primarily set in the Douro valley region of Portugal. The film won Best Picture, Best Original Screenplay and Best Art Direction at the Academy of Motion Picture Arts & Sciences Sophia Awards. It also garnered the Golden Globe for Best Actress (Anabela Moreira) and the Screen Actors Guild GDA Newcomer Award (Martim Canavarro). The film premiered at the Tokyo, São Paulo, Santa Barbara and Gothenburg Film Festivals, winning several accolades in Paris, Rome, Oslo, Liverpool, Casablanca, Vancouver and at the Luso-Brazilian Film Festival. It was broadcast on RTP2, Wowow, AXN movies and is available on Vodafone TVbox in Portugal; UniversCiné in France; U-Next in Japan; Amazon Prime, Kanopy and Tubi platforms in the U.S.A.

== Selected filmography ==
- 2004 – Le Déjeuner Répéter
- 2005 – Maquette
- 2007 – Photomotion
- 2007 – The Balcony
- 2008 – Heiko
- 2009 – L'Arc-en-Ciel
- 2010 – Eden
- 2013 – Cigano
- 2015 – Farewell
- 2020 – The Last Bath
- 2023 – A Silent Film
- 2026 – Dog Day
