= L'arc-en-ciel (film) =

- Directed by: David Bonneville
- Written by: David Bonneville
- Produced by: David Bonneville; Bárbara Valentina; Fernando Vendrell
- Starring: Rafael Morais; Ana Moreira; Carloto Cotta; Jaime Freitas
- Cinematography: Inês Carvalho
- Edited by: Paulo Rebelo
- Music by: Black Bambi; Ruth Chan
- Release date: 21 October 2009 (Lisbon)
- Country: Portugal
- Language: Portuguese

L'arc-en-ciel is a short feature film directed by David Bonneville. It is a co-production by the Calouste Gulbenkian Foundation / David & Golias / RTP2.

The film tells us the story of Quitterie, a 40-year-old European woman, who relives the great love for her deceased 18-year-old Japanese partner by engaging young male strangers into sordid sexual adventures.

== Cast ==
- Sofia Ferrão as Quitterie de Fourchier
- Carloto Cotta as Yahiko
- Nuno Casanovas as Kiyoshi
- Rafael Morais as Gary
- Jaime Freitas as Courier
- Takuya Oshima as Imamura
- Ana Moreira as Secretary Ângela

== Festival highlights ==
- Best Actress award at the International Portuguese Language Film Festival MOSTRALÍNGUA (Winner)
- Honourable Mention at the Austrian Film Festival of Nations (Winner)
- Portobello London Film Festival (Nomination)
- Milan ICF International Film Festival (Nomination)
- Fantasporto International Film Festival (Panorama)
- Bilbao International Film Festival Zinegoak (Nomination)
- Hong Kong Indpanda International Film Festival (Nomination)
