= The Mutants (film) =

1998 Portuguese film by Teresa Villaverde

- Directed by: Teresa Villaverde
- Written by: Teresa Villaverde
- Produced by: Jacques Bidou
- Starring: Ana Moreira
- Cinematography: Acácio de Almeida
- Edited by: Andrée Davanture
- Release date: 27 November 1998
- Running time: 113 minutes
- Country: Portugal
- Language: Portuguese

The Mutants (Portuguese: Os mutantes) is a 1998 Portuguese film by director Teresa Villaverde, starring Ana Moreira and Alexandre Pinto. It was screened in the Un Certain Regard section at the 1998 Cannes Film Festival.

== Plot ==
The lives of three young people living on the streets, as an alternative to the dysfunctional family environments where they grew up: Andreia (Ana Moreira), Pedro (Alexandre Pinto) and Ricardo (Nelson Varela).

Andreia, Pedro and Ricardo don't accept things as they are; they don't fit in anywhere. They never give up, they're always searching for something. They have an invisible force within them that spreads everywhere. Something inside them is always about to explode. It's like a wild energy, a desire to change things, to live differently. They don't quite know what they want, but there's always something that bothers them. They live with a constant need for vertigo, displacement, movement. They refuse to accept the place that was imposed on them before they were even able to choose anything. They don't accept this place, and that's why they don't occupy it. But they have no other. They are survivors. They are the Portuguese mutants, but mutants exist everywhere. Perhaps the world would prefer they didn't exist, but they do. Throughout the film, they dream, cry, laugh, have children, die, and run away.

== Cast ==
- Ana Moreira – Andreia
- Alexandre Pinto – Pedro
- Nelson Varela – Ricardo
- Alexandra Lencastre – Social Worker
- Paulo Pereira – Zezito
- Helder Tavares – Franklin
- Teresa Roby – Pedro's Mother
- António Capelo – Pedro's Father
- Jorge Bruno Gomes – Pedro's Brother
- Samuel Costa – João Paulo
- Carlos Castilho – Artur
- Maria Tengarrinha – Julia
- Marta Sofia Vargas – Paula
- Isabel Ruth – Isabel

== Awards ==
This film was nominated for four Golden Globes, Portugal which were:

- Best Film: Teresa Villaverde
- Best Director: Teresa Villaverde
- Best Actor: Alexandre Pinto
- Best Actress: Ana Moreira
