= Mahshid Mirmoezzi =

Iranian translator

Mahshid Mirmoezi
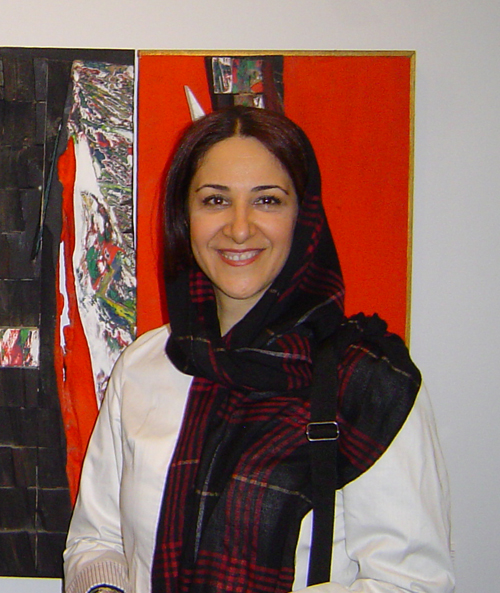
- Born: Qazvin, Iran
- Citizenship: Iranian
- Education: University of Essen
- Writing career
- Language: Persian, German
- Notable awards: Friedrich-Gundolf-Preis Parvin E'tesami Award Abolhassan Najafi Literary Translation Award

Mahshid Mirmoezi (Persian: مهشید میرمعزی) is an Iranian translator from the German language. She has translated over 55 works into the Persian language. She has received several prizes, including the Friedrich-Gundolf-Preis 2023 and Parvin E'tesami Award for her translation of Pascal Mercier's Night Train to Lisbon.

== Biography ==
Mahshid Mirmoezi was born in Qazvin, Iran in 1962. She attended the University of Essen, Germany from 1985, obtaining a degree in environmental engineering. She returned to Iran in 1993.

Mirmoezi worked as a freelance journalist for various publications, including Hamshahri Monthly, Golagha and Rudaki.

Her career as a translator began with Dr. Christian Kägi's Positive deal with the Divorce in 1998. In 2002, her translation of Irvin D. Yalom's When Nietzsche Wept was published which in 2024 is at 22nd edition.

In 2013, she published her translation of Pascal Mercier's Night Train to Lisbon, for which she won the Parvin E'tesami Award. Iran does not recognize various international copyright accords, but Mirmoezi insist to her Iranians publishers to acquire copyrights from the publisher before she translated it.

2016 saw the release of two works: Martin Suter's Lila, Lila as well as Iris Radisch's Camus: The Ideal of Simplicity.

As of 2025, Mirmoezi has published close to 60 translations.

== Awards ==
- Nominated for "Best Book of the Year" 2014/2015 for "Look Who's Back" by Timur Vermes
- Winner of the sixth Parvin Etesami Prize 2015/2016 for "Night Train to Lisbon" by Pascal Mercier
- Winner of "Book of the Year" in Ghazvin Province (biennial) 2020 for "The Immortal Family Salz" by Christopher Kloeble
- Winner of "Book of the Year" in Ghazvin Province (biennial) 2022 for "The World of Yesterday" by Stefan Zweig
- Shortlisted for the Abolhassan Nadjafi Prize, 2022 for "The World of Yesterday" by Stefan Zweig
- Recipient of the Friedrich Gundolf Prize 2023 from the German Academy for Language and Literature
- 2023 Abolhassan Nadjafi Prize for Lifetime Achievement

Shortlisted for "Best Book of the Year" 2025 for "Crossing" by Anna Seghers

== Selected translations ==
- Ruth Berlau (1998). Brechts Lai-Tu. Agah. ISBN 9789649020907.
- Pascal Mercier (2013). Night Train to Lisbon. Ofoq.
- Martin Suter (2016). Lila, Lila. Amut Publications.
- Iris Radisch (2016). Camus: The Ideal of Simplicity. Eine Biographie. Salis.
