= Heiko (film) =

Heiko is a 2008 Portuguese short film, directed by David Bonneville and produced by the Calouste Gulbenkian Foundation. It is 13 minutes long.

The film shows the perverse relationship between a 70-year-old aesthete and a young man named Heiko.

It is part of the DVD compilation 'Boys on Film 4: Protect Me From What I Want' distributed by Peccadillo Pictures.

== Cast ==
- José Manuel Mendes
- Jaime Freitas

== Festival Highlights ==
Heiko had many awards

- Best Short Film Award at the 24th MixCopenhagen International Film Festival (winner)
- Special Mention at the 10th Slamdance Film Festival, Park City, Utah, US (winner)
- IndieLisboa Lisbon International Film Festival (nomination)
- RUSHES Soho Shorts Film Festival, UK (nomination)
- Toronto InsideOut Film Festival, Canada (nomination)
- Torino G&L Film Festival (nomination)
- TIFF Transilvania International Film Festival
