= Jaime (1999 film) =

- Directed by: António-Pedro Vasconcelos
- Screenplay by: Carlos Saboga
- Story by: António-Pedro Vasconcelos
- Produced by: Luís Galvão Teles
- Starring: Saul Fonseca; Sandro Silva; Fernanda Serrano; Joaquim Leitão; Nicolau Breyner
- Cinematography: Edgar Moura; Carlos Assis
- Production companies: Fado Filmes; SIC; Samsa Film; VideoFilmes
- Release date: 9 April 1999 (Portugal)
- Running time: 111 minutes
- Country: Portugal
- Language: Portuguese
- Budget: $377,000,000

Jaime is a 1999 Portuguese drama film directed by António-Pedro Vasconcelos. It was released on 9 April 1999.

== Plot ==
A woman takes her young son, leaves her husband and moves in with her lover. The boy, desperate to get his parents back together, becomes convinced that if only he can get his father's stolen motorcycle back everything will be fine again, so he sets out to get enough money to buy his father a new one. unsentimental tale about underage street kids in Portugal. The film opens with a teenage worker at a bakery getting dumped off at a hospital after losing his finger. The boss instructs the youth's father to tell the doctors that he lost his digit playing with a knife, but fearing an investigation, the boss subsequently dumps his other underage workers, including 13-year old Jaime (Saul Fonseca). Jaime is struggling to mend his tattered family. His mother threw his father out of the house and has taken up with a disreputable Brazilian. His heartbroken father moved into a shack and has been unemployed since his moped was stolen. Jaime's hopes that he could reunite his family by buying his dad a replacement scooter are dashed when the Brazilian steals his cash; Jaime subsequently moves out of his mom's place and in with his father. Meanwhile, Jaime and his sidekick Ulisses (Sandro Silva) sleep during their days at school and look for job opportunities at night.

== Cast ==
- Saul Fonseca as Jaime
- Sandro Silva as Ulisses
- Fernanda Serrano as Marta
- Joaquim Leitão as Abel
- Nicolau Breyner

== Reception ==
=== Accolades ===
Award	Date	Category	Recipients and nominees	Result
San Sebastián International Film Festival	25 September 1999	Special Jury Prize	Jaime	Won
Globos de Ouro	2 April 2000	Best Film	Jaime	Won
Globos de Ouro	2 April 2000	Best Director	António-Pedro Vasconcelos	Won
Caminhos do Cinema Português	8 April 2000	Audience Award - Feature Film	Jaime	Won
Cannes Film Festival	22 May 2000	Grand Prix Cannes Junior	Jaime	Won
Cannes Film Festival	22 May 2000	CICAE Award	Jaime	Won
European Film Awards	2 December 2000	European Film Award for Best Cinematographer	Edgar Moura	Nominated
