= Swan (2011 film) =

- Directed by: Teresa Villaverde
- Written by: Teresa Villaverde
- Produced by: Teresa Villaverde
- Starring: Beatriz Batarda; Miguel Nunes
- Cinematography: Acácio de Almeida
- Edited by: Andrée Davanture
- Production company: Alce Filmes
- Release date: September 8, 2011
- Running time: 105 minutes
- Country: Portugal
- Language: Portuguese

Swan (Portuguese: Cisne) is a 2011 Portuguese film directed by Teresa Villaverde.

== Plot summary ==
Vera is a singer in her thirties. She returns to Lisbon for the last performance of a concert tour. The warmth and beauty of Lisbon make anyone want to be happy. Her companion Pablo, whom she chose from among the many who answered her questionnaire and who is full of mysteries, helps her through sleepless nights. She has no family, but she wishes she did. Vera fears nothing and has no connections. In her house, far from everything, is Sam, the man she loves. They only understand each other from a distance, and through writing. The house is hers, but he has appeared to stay. He asks her to leave, because he needs to be alone; close to his things, but not with her. She is hurt, but agrees and leaves him. A child under Pablo's care commits an irreparable act, and something needs to be done.

== Cast ==
- Beatriz Batarda as Vera
- Miguel Nunes as Pablo
- Israel Pimenta as Sam
- Sérgio Fernandes as Alce
- Rita Loureiro as Bela
- Marcello Urgeghe as Santis
- Tânia Paiva as Amy
- Carlos Guímaro as Taxista

== Reception ==
The film was shown at the Orizzonti section of the 68th Venice International Film Festival.
