= O Fantasma =

2000 film by João Pedro Rodrigues

- Portuguese theatrical release poster
- Directed by: João Pedro Rodrigues
- Written by: João Pedro Rodrigues; José Neves; Paulo Rebelo; Alexandre Melo
- Produced by: Amândio Coroado
- Starring: Ricardo Meneses; Beatriz Torcato; André Barbosa; Eurico Vieira
- Cinematography: Rui Poças
- Edited by: Paulo Rebelo; João Pedro Rodrigues
- Production companies: Rosa Filmes; Radiotelevisão Portuguesa; Instituto do Cinema, Audiovisual e Multimédia
- Distributed by: Rosa Filmes
- Release dates: 8 September 2000 (Venice); 20 October 2000 (Portugal)
- Running time: 87 minutes
- Country: Portugal
- Language: Portuguese
- Box office: $126,783 (United States)

O Fantasma (English: The Phantom or The Ghost) is a 2000 Portuguese erotic drama film directed by João Pedro Rodrigues (in his feature directorial debut) and produced by the independent production company Rosa Filmes.

== Premise ==
Young and handsome Sérgio works the night shift as a trash collector in Lisbon. He is uninterested in his pretty female co-worker Fatima, who displays an avid interest in him, so instead Sérgio roams the city. Eventually Sérgio becomes fascinated with a sleek motorcycle and its arrogant owner—a young man completely indifferent to Sérgio. Sérgio's surfacing desires unleash his darkest impulses, sending him down a dangerous path of violence, depravity, and degradation.

== Cast ==
- Ricardo Meneses as Sérgio
- Beatriz Torcato as Fátima
- André Barbosa as João
- Eurico Vieira as Virgílio
- Jorge Almeida as police officer
- Joaquim Oliveira as Mário
- Florindo Lourenço as Matos
- Maria Paola Porru as João's mother

== Reception ==
The film premiered at the Venice International Film Festival. It won the prize for Best Feature Film in the New York Lesbian & Gay Film Festival and the Entrevues Film Festival. Meneses was nominated for the 2001 Portuguese Golden Globe award for Best Leading Actor.
