= Water and Salt (film) =

2001 French romantic drama film

- Directed by: Teresa Villaverde
- Written by: Teresa Villaverde
- Starring: Galatea Ranzi; Joaquim de Almeida; Alexandre Pinto; Maria de Medeiros; Chico Buarque
- Cinematography: Emmanuel Machuel
- Edited by: Andrée Davanture
- Release date: 2001
- Language: Portuguese

Water and Salt (Portuguese: Água e Sal, Italian: Acqua e sale) is a 2001 romantic drama film written and directed by Teresa Villaverde.

A co-production between Portugal and Italy, it premiered at the 58th edition of the Venice Film Festival, in the Cinema of the Present sidebar.

== Cast ==
- Galatea Ranzi as Ana
- Joaquim de Almeida as Marido
- Alexandre Pinto as Alexandre
- Maria de Medeiros as Vera
- Chico Buarque as Amante
- Clara Jost as Criança
- Miguel Borges as Desconhecido
- Lúcia Sigalho as Senhora
- Joel Miranda as Rapazito
- Ana Moreira as Emília
- Lula Pena as Senhora
- Teresa Madruga
