= Dominique Devenport =

Swiss-American actress

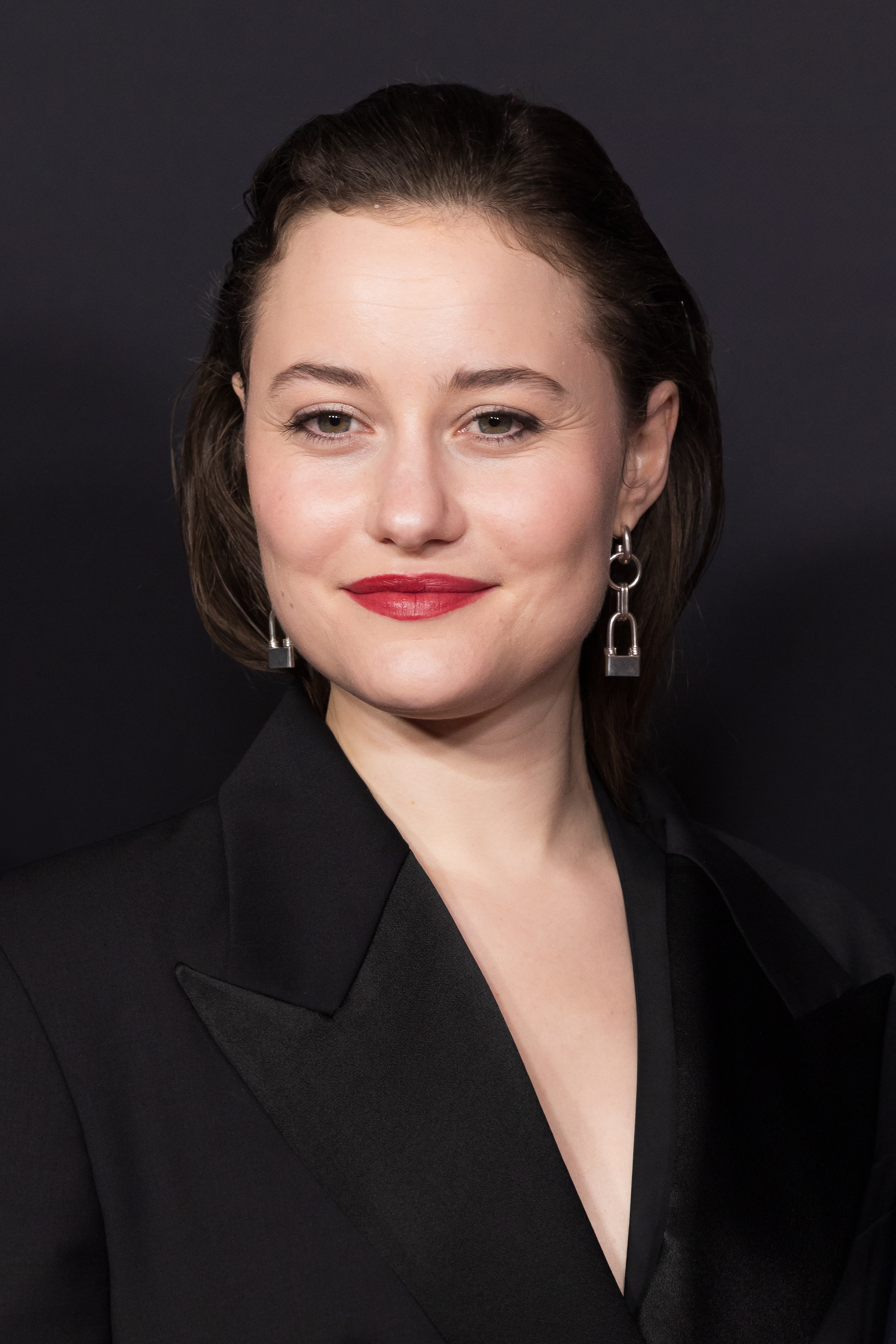
- Devenport in 2024
- Occupation: Actress
- Years active: 2012–present

Dominique Devenport is a Swiss-American actress who is best known as Empress Elisabeth of Austria in Sisi.

She has also appeared in:

- "Head in the Clouds" (2012) - Toni
- Night Train to Lisbon (2013) - Natalie
- The Forger (2022) - Ellen
- Davos 1917 (2023)
- Love Roulette (2026)

She was nominated as Best Actress for the 2023 German Television Awards for her role as Sisi.
