= Night Train to Lisbon =

2004 novel by Pascal Mercier

- Original German cover
- Author: Pascal Mercier
- Translator: Barbara Harshav
- Language: German
- Genre: Novel
- Publisher: Carl Hanser Verlag
- Publication date: 2004
- Publication place: Switzerland
- English publication date: 2008
- Media type: Print (Paperback)
- Pages: 438 pp. first paperback English Edition
- ISBN: 3-446-20555-1 (German); ISBN 978-0-8021-4397-6 (English Paperback)

Night Train to Lisbon is a philosophical novel by Swiss writer Pascal Mercier. It recounts the travels of Swiss Classics instructor Raimund Gregorius as he explores the life of Amadeu de Prado, a Portuguese doctor, during António de Oliveira Salazar's right-wing dictatorship in Portugal. Prado is a serious thinker whose active mind becomes evident in a series of his notes collected and read by Gregorius.

The book was originally published in German as Nachtzug nach Lissabon in 2004 and was first published in English in 2008. The novel became an international bestseller. Danish film director Bille August adapted the book into a 2013 film of the same name, starring Jeremy Irons as Raimund Gregorius.

The real night train from Hendaye (France) to Lisbon was stopped during the Covid pandemic after running for decades. All train connections from France to Portugal were cancelled in 2022 due to the Spanish-French Railroad War.

== Plot ==
Raimund "Mundus" Gregorius, 57 years old, is a teacher at a Swiss gymnasium in modern-day Bern. He is an expert in ancient languages (ancient Greek, Latin and Hebrew) and a man very comfortable in his routine. One morning on his way to work, he saves a mysterious Portuguese woman from what he assumes is a suicide attempt. Although the woman disappears shortly afterwards, their chance-encounter marks the beginning of Raimund's journey. Later that day, he visits an antiquarian bookshop where he discovers Um ourives das palavras (A Goldsmith of Words, this may refer to Gil Vicente, a formidable playwright and poet of the Portuguese Renaissance who had possibly been a goldsmith), a book by Amadeu de Prado. The author ponders the philosophical issue of going back in time and making various different choices, resulting in a completely different life. Raimund is immediately intrigued by the author's somber musings. The book is in Portuguese, a language Raimund doesn't speak, so he begins translating with the help of a dictionary. Sensing a kindred spirit in Amadeu, he is suddenly gripped by the fear of not living his life to its full potential. The next morning, he abandons his teaching position, turns his back on Bern and sets out for Lisbon. There, he begins investigating the fate of the Prado family.

Amadeu de Prado is a doctor during the Salazar dictatorship (1928–1974). He has an expressed interest in literature and begins questioning his world, his experiences and the words contained in conversation and written thought. His life and thoughts are strongly influenced by living under an oppressive regime, relying heavily upon a brutal secret police force, the PIDE. Maria João Ávila, a girl he adores since childhood, seems to be the only person Amadeu can relate to.

His father, a stern man and a judge loyal to the government, later crumbles under the pressure of his conscience and commits suicide. Amadeu, who is by now an accomplished and well-liked doctor, saves the life of Mendez, the "Butcher of Lisbon" and Chief of Secret Police. In the public eye, Amadeu's actions mark him down as a traitor, resulting in him being shunned and secretly joining the resistance to ease his conscience. After his premature death due to an aneurysm, Amadeu's notes and journal entries are edited and published by his sister Adriana. She owes her life to Amadeu and religiously devotes her energy to preserving her brother's legacy.

During his stay in Lisbon, Raimund meets the ophthalmologist Mariana Eça. She prescribes him new glasses when he breaks his old ones in an accident. Mariana's uncle, João Eça, was a member of the resistance. Raimund visits him several times to talk about Amadeu.

Raimund also manages to track down Jorge O'Kelly, a pharmacy owner and Amadeu's best friend who helped him join the resistance, and Estefânia Espinhosa, a woman with an exceptional memory. Amadeu was in love with her, even though she was Jorge's girlfriend at the time. She later fled the country and became a professor of history at the University of Salamanca.

The story ends with Raimund returning to Bern. Raimund, who has been suffering from spells of dizziness for a while now, submits himself to a physical exam.

== Themes ==
Night Train to Lisbon spends considerable time contemplating ideas, exploring on one hand Gregorious' contemplation of self and the other de Prado's journal and philosophies. Epigraphs include Michel de Montaigne, Essais, Second Book, I, “De l’inconstance de nos actions” and Fernando Pessoa, Livro do Desassossego (Portuguese: Book of Disquiet/Restlessness).

Mercier uses various activities and subthemes to help explore these deep, self-reflective subjects including "night journeys, insomnia and dream-filled sleep, of being stuck in place yet somehow adrift, and confusion about life's purpose." With this introspective approach, Mercier is able to review concepts of "who we are, how we control our experience of life, and how fragile that construction is."

== Style ==
Like the depiction of the city of Lisbon as mysterious and intricate, the text of Night Train to Lisbon is intricate and complicated, sometimes withholding information from the reader. Multiple reviewers also pointed to the thriller qualities the novel takes on despite the philosophical focus of the themes.

== Critical reception ==
Anne Phillips in The News-Gazette noted that Night Train to Lisbon was "reminiscent of Carlos Ruiz Zafón's The Shadow of the Wind" and commented that "mystery romance and political intrigue" keep the pages turning. Robert Moyle of the Herald Sun also points out how engaging Night Train to Lisbon is, pointing out how easy it is for the reader to identify with Gregorius. Daniel Johnson of The Telegraph placed Mercier, with this novel, amongst the best European novelists alive.

== Translations ==
Iranian writer Mahshid Mirmoezzi translated the book into Persian, with its release in April 2013. Iran does not recognize various international copyright accords, but Mirmoezzi received permission from the author before she translated it. She won the Parvin Award for her translation.

== Film adaptation ==
Danish film director Bille August's film adaptation of the same name, with Jeremy Irons as Raimund Gregorius, was released in 2013.

== Impact ==
During the Sunflower Student Movement in Taiwan on 21 March 2014, the wall of the second floor of the Legislative Yuan was sprayed with a quote from the work, "when dictatorship is a fact, revolution becomes a duty."
