= Pedro e Inês =

Portuguese television series

- Genre: Historical fiction
- Written by: Francisco Moita Flores
- Starring: Pedro Laginha; Ana Moreira; Nicolau Breyner; Ana Bustorff
- Country of origin: Portugal
- Original language: Portuguese
- No. of episodes: 13

Original release
- Network: RTP1
- Release: 2005 – 2005

Pedro e Inês is a Portuguese television series first aired on RTP1 in 2005, based on the story of Peter I of Portugal and Inês de Castro.

== Cast ==
- Pedro Laginha - D. Pedro
- Ana Moreira - D. Inês
- Nicolau Breyner - D. Afonso IV
- Ana Bustorff - Beatriz de Castela
- Leonor Seixas - D. Constança
- Sofia de Portugal - Teresa Lourenço
- Duarte Guimarães - Rodrigo
- Fernanda Lapa - D. Maria
- Adriano Carvalho - João Afonso
- Paula Lobo Antunes - Maid Catarina
- Filomena Gonçalves - Abadessa
- Manuel Wiborg - Diogo Pacheco
- José Eduardo - Álvaro Pais
- António Capelo - Lopo Fernandes
- António Montez - Bispo de Lisboa
- José Fidalgo - Pêro Coelho
- Sofia Póvoas - Irmã Augusta

== Production ==
It was filmed in Tomar and in the Alcobaça Monastery.
