= 7 Pecados Rurais =

2013 film by Nicolau Breyner

- Directed by: Nicolau Breyner
- Edited by: Miguel D. A. Pais
- Distributed by: ZON Lusomundo Audiovisuais
- Release date: 21 November 2013
- Country: Portugal
- Language: Portuguese

7 Pecados Rurais is a 2013 Portuguese film directed by Nicolau Breyner. It was the Portuguese film with the largest number of admissions in Portugal in 2013 with 281,423.
