= Cats Don't Have Vertigo =

- Portuguese poster
- Directed by: António-Pedro Vasconcelos
- Written by: Tiago Santos
- Produced by: Tino Navarro
- Starring: Maria do Céu Guerra; João Jesus; Nicolau Breyner
- Cinematography: José António Loureiro
- Edited by: Pedro Ribeiro
- Music by: Luís Cília
- Production companies: Rádio e Televisão de Portugal; MGN Filmes
- Distributed by: NOS Audiovisuais
- Release date: 25 September 2014
- Running time: 124 minutes
- Country: Portugal
- Language: Portuguese
- Box office: €500,000

Cats Don't Have Vertigo (Portuguese: Os Gatos Não Têm Vertigens) is a 2014 Portuguese film directed by António-Pedro Vasconcelos.

== Cast ==
- Maria do Céu Guerra as Rosa
- João Jesus as Jó
- Nicolau Breyner as Joaquim
- Fernanda Serrano as Luísa

== Production ==
The film was shot in Lisbon.
