= Night Train to Lisbon (film) =

2013 film

- Theatrical release poster
- Directed by: Bille August
- Written by: Greg Latter; Ulrich Herrmann
- Based on: Night Train to Lisbon by Pascal Mercier
- Produced by: Andreas Knoblauch; Michael Lehmann; Kerstin Ramcke; Peter Reichenbach; Gunther Russ; Benjamin Seikel
- Starring: Jeremy Irons
- Cinematography: Filip Zumbrunn
- Edited by: Hansjörg Weißbrich
- Music by: Annette Focks
- Production companies: Studio Hamburg FilmProduktion; C-Films AG; Cinemate; K5 International; TMG
- Distributed by: Lusomundo (Portugal); Concorde Filmverleih (Germany)
- Release dates: 13 February 2013 (Berlin); 7 March 2013 (Germany); 6 December 2013 (United States)
- Running time: 111 minutes
- Countries: Germany; Switzerland; Portugal
- Language: English

Night Train to Lisbon is a 2013 internationally co-produced English-language drama film directed by Bille August and starring Jeremy Irons. Based on the 2004 novel Night Train to Lisbon by Pascal Mercier and written by Greg Latter and Ulrich Herrmann, the film is about a Swiss teacher who saves the life of a woman and then abandons his teaching career and reserved life. The film premiered out of competition at the 63rd Berlin International Film Festival.

== Plot ==
Walking over a bridge on the way to his school in Bern, Raimund Gregorius, a Swiss professor of philosophy, notices a young woman in a red coat standing on the railing, about to leap. Dropping his briefcase, he runs and pulls her down. She helps him gather the papers that have spilled from his briefcase and accompanies him to the school where he teaches. But instead of waiting to talk, she leaves during the middle of his class, without her coat.

Concerned, Raimund grabs the coat and runs after her, but in vain. He checks her pockets for identification. All he finds is a small Portuguese book, a memoir of sorts, by Amadeu de Prado. It is stamped with the address of the bookstore where he happens to be a regular customer and he goes there. The bookseller remembers the girl's purchasing this obscure book and, as Raimund leafs through it, a train ticket to Lisbon falls out. The train is leaving in 15 minutes. Confused and doubtful, Raimund rushes to the station, but the woman is nowhere in sight. At the last moment he decides to use the ticket himself and jumps on the train. During the journey he reads the book.

Amadeu de Prado lived in Lisbon, so Raimund searches for him, hoping that this will lead to the woman. He finds Amadeu's home, where the writer's sister, Adriana, welcomes Raimund; she gives him the impression her brother still lives there. Raimund learns that Amadeu was a doctor, and that only 100 copies of his book were printed after his death. When Raimund asks what happened to their father, Adriana's reaction is hostile. As Raimund is leaving, the maid informs him that he can find Amadeu in the town's cemetery. Raimund finds the tomb: Amadeu had died in 1974.

In the street, a cyclist runs into Raimund and smashes his glasses. While obtaining new glasses from a local optician, Mariana, Raimund narrates his experiences. When he returns to collect the glasses, Mariana tells Raimund that her uncle had known Amadeu de Prado well and was willing to talk to Raimund.

Raimund and Mariana both go to the nursing home where her uncle João Eça resides, and Raimund learns João and Amadeu were both in the resistance against the Salazar dictatorship. The story of their part in the resistance is told in flashbacks as the film continues. Raimund then visits the priest who had taught and later buried Amadeu de Prado. The priest explains that Amadeu, an exceptionally smart young boy from an aristocratic background, befriended Jorge O'Kelly, another bright boy in the school although he was from a working-class family. The boys bonded through their love for knowledge, particularly the philosophical and political knowledge not permitted under Salazar. Amadeu gave a graduation speech that reflected his contempt for the regime, causing many of the families in the audience to walk out, much to the chagrin of his father, a well respected judge.

Raimund returns to Adriana and asks for her side of the story, and then he revisits João to obtain more information. Raimund learns that Amadeu died of an aneurysm, which he knew he had, but had not told Adriana about. As a doctor, Amadeu never refused a patient, and when Mendes, a powerful member of Salazar's political police, called "the Butcher of Lisbon", was brought to Amadeu's clinic, he saved the man's life. Amadeu's friends were shocked by this, especially Jorge, who at that time was already in the resistance. Later, Amadeu confronted Jorge and declared that he too would join the resistance.

Jorge introduced Amadeu to João and to his girlfriend Estefânia, a beautiful woman with a photographic memory who helped the resistance by memorizing people's names and contact information. But Amadeu and Estefânia were instantly attracted to each other. Jorge discovered that Estefânia loved Amadeu and was crushed by her betrayal. When the revolution against Salazar began, Amadeu fled to Spain with Estefânia but she refused his offer to start a new life together in Brazil. Raimund learned where she went to live and went there to find out if she was still alive. They talk and Raimund tells Estefânia that Amadeu's death had nothing to do with her leaving Amadeu.

The suicidal woman from the bridge in Bern has tracked Raimund down and waits for him in the lobby of his hotel in Lisbon. She came to thank Raimund for saving her life. She tells him that she had felt suicidal because she had just learned from the book that her beloved grandfather was the Butcher of Lisbon, but she is learning to accept this. Raimund had brought with him the red coat she was wearing that day in Bern and he gives it back to her.

The events have become a catalyst to Raimund's sedate life, in a gentle sort of way. Yet he informs the school that he will now return to his job. Mariana accompanies him to the railway station and, at the last moment, suggests that he could instead stay in Lisbon. The film ends with Raimund looking at Mariana with the train about to pull out of the station, leaving Raimund with time to leave or stay.

== Cast ==
- Jeremy Irons as Raimund Gregorius
- Lena Olin as Estefânia
  - Mélanie Laurent as young Estefânia
- Jack Huston as Amadeu de Prado
- Martina Gedeck as Mariana
- Nicolau Breyner as Silva
- Bruno Ganz as Jorge O'Kelly
  - August Diehl as young Jorge O'Kelly
- Christopher Lee as Father Bartolomeu
  - Filipe Vargas as young Father Bartolomeu
- Charlotte Rampling as Adriana de Prado
  - Beatriz Batarda as young Adriana de Prado
- Tom Courtenay as João Eça
  - Marco d'Almeida as young João Eça
- Burghart Klaußner as Judge Prado
- Adriano Luz as Rui Luís Mendes, the “Butcher of Lisbon”
- Sarah Spale-Bühlmann as Catarina Mendes
- Dominique Devenport as Natalie

== Reception ==
The Hollywood Reporter's David Rooney wrote: Bille August's direction was caught in "an outmoded storytelling approach" where "key events" remained "hopelessly page-bound", while Variety's Boyd van Hoeij called the film "a relic", just "waffly rather than talky and entirely devoid of tension". On the review aggregator website Rotten Tomatoes, 41% of 29 critics' reviews are positive. On Metacritic, the film has a score of 30 out of 100, based on 8 critics, indicating "generally unfavorable" reviews. Geoffrey Macnab of The Independent said that the film is "beautifully shot and packed with big-name cameos".
