= Colo (film) =

2017 film

- Film poster
- Directed by: Teresa Villaverde
- Written by: Teresa Villaverde
- Produced by: Cécile Vacheret; Teresa Villaverde
- Starring: Beatriz Batarda
- Cinematography: Acácio de Almeida
- Edited by: Rodolphe Molla
- Production companies: Alce Filmes; Sedna Films
- Release date: 15 February 2017 (Berlin)
- Running time: 136 minutes
- Country: Portugal
- Language: Portuguese

Colo is a 2017 Portuguese drama film directed by Teresa Villaverde. It was selected to compete for the Golden Bear in the main competition section of the 67th Berlin International Film Festival.

== Plot ==
In Lisboa, a mother has two jobs while her husband is homeless, the effects of the economic crisis two years 2010. They have a daughter, who tries to find her way through the new financial limitations. With the hardships that accumulate, gradually the members of this family grow at ease with each other, and a tension grows in silence and guilt. The homeless country spends its days smelling the landscape on the horizon that does not offer opportunities for the future. Mãe always returns home exhausted after working double shifts. The daughter keeps secrets for herself, idealizing a life with money.

== Cast ==
- Beatriz Batarda
- Angela Cerveira
- Marcello Urgeghe
- Ricardo Aibéo
- Clara Jost
