= Cigano (film) =

Gypsy \ Cigano
- Directed by: David Bonneville
- Written by: David Bonneville, Diego Rocha
- Produced by: Bárbara Valentina; Fernando Vendrell
- Starring: Jaime Freitas; Tiago Aldeia
- Cinematography: Vasco Viana
- Edited by: Mariana Gaivão
- Music by: Buraka Som Sistema
- Release date: July 10, 2013 (Portugal)
- Country: Portugal
- Language: Portuguese

Gypsy is a short feature film directed by David Bonneville. It premiered at Locarno and was SXSW Grand Jury Award nominee. The film was funded by the ICA - Portuguese Film Institute / RTP and produced by Bárbara Valentina and Fernando Vendrell.

The film tells us the story of a wealthy young man called Sebastian. He finds out he has a flat tyre and ends up accepting help from a Gypsy passer-by. In return Sebastian will have to give him a ride home... but they won't reach their expected destination.

== Cast ==
- Jaime Freitas
- Tiago Aldeia

== Festival Highlights ==
- The Cambridge Strawberry Shorts Film Festival (Cambridge Cinema Shorts Commendation)
- Romania Twelve Month Film Festival (Director of the Month Award - David Bonneville)
- Annual Awards Shortcutz Viseu (Best Director Award - David Bonneville; Best Actor - Tiago Aldeia)
- Mexico International Film Festival (Golden Palm Award for Best Short Fiction)
- Elche International Festival of Independent Film (Elche City Award for Best Short Film)
- Shortcutz Xpress Faro (March Award and Audience Award for Best Film)
- Shortcutz Lisboa (February Award for Best Film)
- CBA Awards (Best Short Film Nominee)
- CinEuphoria Awards (National Competition: Top Shorts of the Year - David Bonneville; Best Actor - Tiago Aldeia; Best Cinematography - Vasco Viana)
- Shortcutz Porto (January Award for Best Film)
- Festival Caminhos do Cinema Português (Best Supporting Actor Award for Jaime Freitas)
- Aesthetica Short Film Festival (ASFF)
- Izmir International Short Film Festival (Golden Cat Award for Best International Fiction)
- QueerLisboa18 International Film Festival (Best Short Film - Audience Award)
- Shortcutz Xpress Viseu (Fortnight Award and September Award for Best Film)
- Faro International Short Film Festival (Medal for Best Fiction Film)
- Festival der Nationen (Lenzing Award in Silver)
- Tanger International Film Festival (nominee)
- Rhode Island Film Festival (Nominated)
- London ShortsOnTap (Jury Award - Best Film; Top 7 films of 2014)
- Toronto WildSounds Film Festival (Best Global Performance Award and Best Cinematography Award)
- Palm Springs International Film Festival (Live Action Award nominee)
- SXSW Film Festival (Grand Jury Award nominee)
- Brest European Short Film Festival (Official selection)
- Tampere Film Festival (Official competition)
- Guadalajara Mexico Film Festival (Iberoamerican Shorts Competition)
- Cork Film Festival, Ireland
- Istanbul Short Film Festival, Turkey
- Adana Golden Boll Film Festival (Competition Section)
- Leuven International Short Film Festival (Nomination)
- Adana Golden Boll International Film Festival (Nomination)
- Kolkata Shorts International Film Festival (Nomination: Best Film)
- Hamptons International Film Festival (1 of the 5 Golden Starfish Award nominees)
- Locarno International Film Festival (International premiere)
- Curtas Vila do Conde Short Film Festival (National premiere)
- Festival de Cannes Court Métrage, ShortFilmCorner (Distinction Coup de Coeur des Programmateurs Internationaux)
