= Álvaro Magalhães (writer) =

Portuguese writer

- Born: 1951 (age 74–75); Porto
- Occupation: Writer

Álvaro Magalhães (Portuguese pronunciation: [ˈalvɐɾu mɐɣɐˈʎɐ̃jʃ]; born 1951 in Porto) is a Portuguese writer. In 1982 he published his first book, História com muitas letras. Since then, Álvaro Magalhães wrote many other stories. His most prominent work, in literature, however, is the series of books Triângulo Jota. These books are about three children, Jorge, Joana and Joel who solve crimes with paranormal contours.
Álvaro Magalhães also received the award Grande Prémio Calouste Gulbenkian de Literatura para Crianças e Jovens 2002 for his book Hipopóptimos – Uma História de Amor.
