= Prémio Autores =

- Country: Portugal
- Presented by: Sociedade Portuguesa de Autores
- First award: 2010

The Prémio Autores are awards presented annually by the Sociedade Portuguesa de Autores since 2010.

== Ceremonies ==
- 1st: 28 February
- 2nd: 21 February
- 3rd: 27 February
- 4th: 25 February
- 5th: 8 May

== Categories ==
=== Visual arts ===
- Best Photographic Work
- Best Plastic Arts Exhibition
- Best Scenographic Work

=== Dance ===
- Best Choreography

=== Radio ===
- Best Radio Program

=== Television ===
- Best Entertainment Program
- Best Fiction Program
- Best Information Program

=== Film ===
- Best Screenplay
- Best Actress
- Best Actor
- Best Film

=== Music ===
- Best Song
- Best Erudite Music Work
- Best Album

=== Theatre ===
- Best Performed Portuguese Text
- Best Show
- Best Actress
- Best Actor

=== Literature ===
- Best Children's and Juvenile Book
- Best Poetry Book
- Best Narrative Fiction Book

== See also ==
- List of European art awards
