= Luciano Rigolini =

Swiss visual artist, photographer and producer

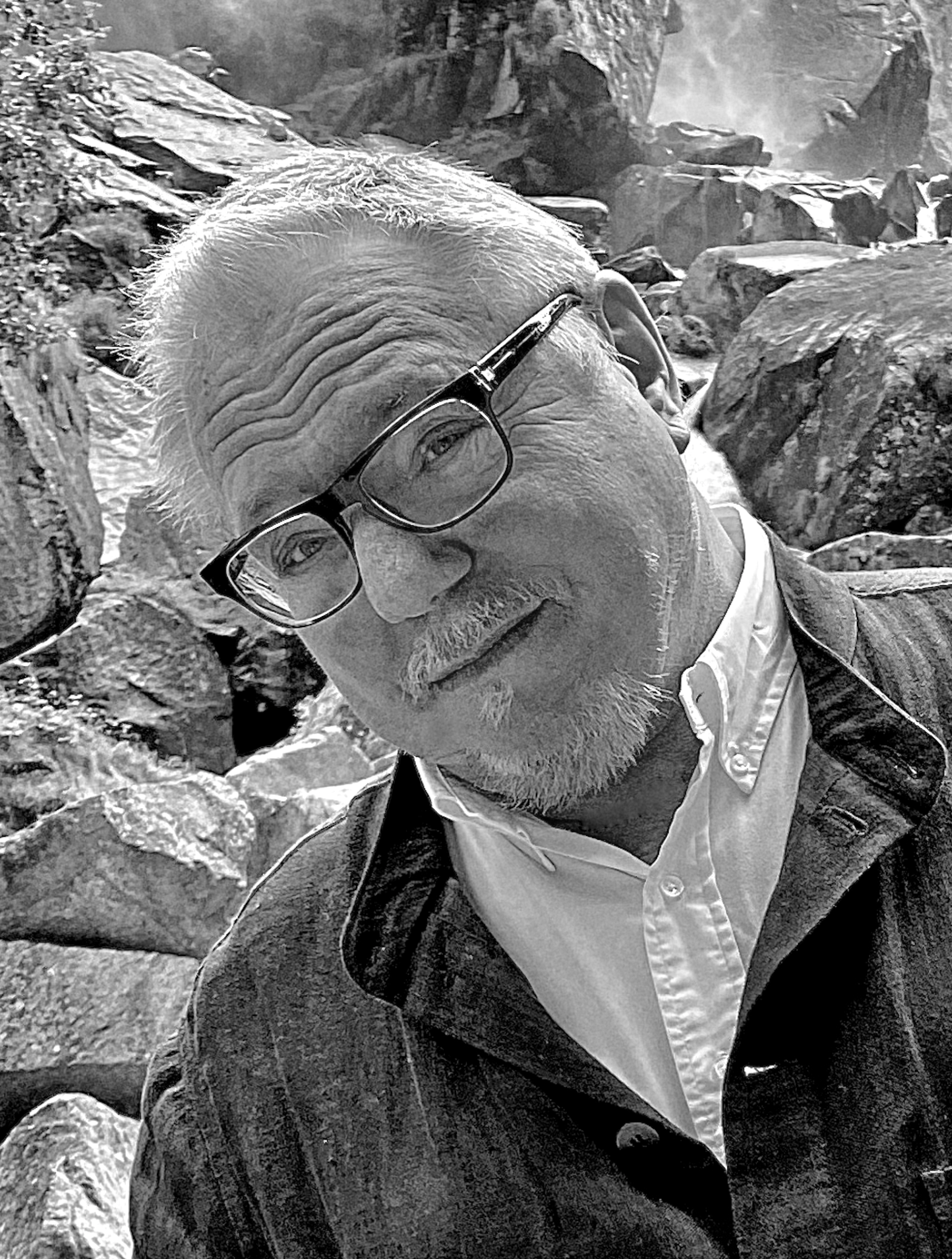
- Born: August 2, 1950; Tesserete, Ticino, Switzerland
- Known for: Documentary production, photography

Luciano Rigolini (born 2 August 1950) is a Swiss artist, photographer, bookmaker, producer, and former commissioning editor at Arte in Paris. Swiss Grand Award for Design 2024, the highest honour for Swiss designer and photographers assigned by the Federal Office of Culture (FOC)

== Life and work ==
He studied cinema but soon turned to photography.

In 1995 he joined the documentary unit of the European television channel Arte in Paris, where he was responsible for creative author film development until 2015. He produced films by filmmakers such as Chris Marker, Alexandre Sokourov, Naomi Kawase, Chantal Akerman, Apichatpong Weerasethakul, Tsai Ming-liang, Laurie Anderson. He is the author of Arte of Collection Photo, 12 documentaries on the history of photography from its origins to today with the scientific collaboration of Quentin Bajac.

Since 2002 he has been working in photography exclusively through appropriation and rereading of amateur images and industrial documents. His work is also expressed through several author's books. Parr and Badger include Surrogates (2012) in the third volume of their photobook history. They write: "In Surrogates, he has taken as his source imagery spare parts for vintage cars available for sale on eBay. He then retouches and greatly enlarges them, presenting them on plain or colour-field backgrounds so that they become re-contextualized as formal images, stripped from their former function". Private/Used (2013) is a book of photographs of women in lingerie, selling their used underwear on eBay. Mask (2015) is a collection of grilles of cars made in Detroit between 1955 and 1962.

He taught cinema and photography in several universities, including the Rice University of Houston, the Sci-Arc (Southern California Institute of Architecture), the Head (Geneva University of Art and Design) and the Documentary Master of the Pompeu Fabra University in Barcelona. In 2024 Luciano Rigolini won the Swiss Grand Award for Design, the highest honour for Swiss designer and photographers assigned by the Federal Office of Culture (FOC)

== Publications ==
- Luciano Rigolini: Fotografie '90–'92. Lugano: Museo Cantonale d'Arte, 1992. OCLC 81900321. Catalog of an exhibition held at the Museo Cantonale d'Arte, Lugano, 1992/93. German and Italian.
- Luciano Rigolini: Città aperta-Open City, Photographs 1990-1995. Catalog, Houston: Farish Gallery, Rice University School of Architecture, 1995.
- Une Tour. Paris: Edition Textuel, 2001. ISBN 978-2845970267.
- Ritmo 04. Museo Cantonale d’Arte, 2004.
- La forma dello sguardo. Mendrisio Academy Press, 2007. ISBN 9788887624335.
- What you see. Fotostiftung Schweiz and Lars Müller publisher, 2008. ISBN 978-3037781395.
- Another image. Skira, 2011. ISBN 978-8857213330.
- Surrogates. Paris: Centre Culturel Suisse; Lausanne: Musée de l'Elysée, 2012. ISBN 9782909230122.
- Private/Used. Zurich: Patrick Frey, 2013. ISBN 978-3-905929-47-8.
- Mask. Zurich: Patrick Frey, 2015. ISBN 978-3-905929-81-2.
- AS 15-16. Zurich: Patrick Frey, 2018. ISBN 978-3-906803-63-0.
- Inexplicata Volantes. Tokyo: Akio Nagasawa Publishing, 2022.

"Apparere", 2024 . Paris: Atelier EXB, . (ISBN 978-2-36511-423-3

Something, almost nothing, ROMA publishing, 2026 (ISBN 9789464461152)

== Exhibitions ==
=== Solo exhibitions ===
- Luciano Rigolini: Fotografie ’90–’92, Museo Cantonale d'Arte, Lugano, 1992
- Luciano Rigolini, Città aperta-Open City, Photographs 1990-1995, Farish Gallery, Rice University School of Architecture, Houston, 1995
- Luciano RIgolini. Photographs 1990-1995, Foto Forum, St. Gallen, 1996
- Fotostiftung Schweiz, Winterthur, 2008
- Luciano Rigolini. Another image, Max Museo-Spazio Officina, Chiasso, 2011.
- Surrogates, Centre Culturelle Suisse, Paris, 2012
- Luciano Rigolini, Concept Car, Musée de l’Elysée, Lausanne, 2012-13.
- Luciano Rigolini – Landscape, Buchmann Art Galerie, Lugano, 2015.

Luciano Rigolini,"FOTOGRAFICA", Fondation d'Art Erich Lindenberg, Porza/Lugano, 2024/25

=== Group exhibitions ===
- La fotografia contemporanea della collezione Gernsheim, Magazzini del sale, Venezia, e Roemer-Museum, Hildesheim, 1995
- Architecture in black and white, Kunst- und Austellungshalle, der Bundesrepublik Deutschland, Bonn, 1997
- Il San Gottardo come arteria, Galleria Gottardo, Lugano, 1997
- Icons: magnets of meaning, San Francisco Museum of Modern Art, 1997
- Zürich-Ein Fotoprtrait, Kunsthaus Zürich, 1997
- Fondation Cartier pour l'Art Contemporain, Paris, 2017
- Fotografia Europea-European Photography, Galleria Gottardo, Reggio Emilia, 2017
- Pendulum. Moving goods, moving people, Fondazione Mast, Bologna, 2018
- Moonstruck: Photographic Explorations, Fotostiftung Schweiz, Winterthur, 2019
- Limited Series, Museo Nazionale dell'Automobile, Torino, 2026

== Films ==
- Documenta 7 (1982) – director; about Documenta 7
- Portraits, 10 Swiss Artists Today (1987) – director
- The worlds of silence (2001) – director (with Silvana Bezzola)
- Naomi Kawase, Kya ka ra ba (2001) – commissioning editor Arte France
- Angela Ricci Lucchi, Yervant Gianikian, Images d’orient-Tourisme vandale (2001) – commissioning editor Arte France
- Alexandre Sokourov, Elegie de la traversée (2001) – commissioning editor Arte France
- Serguei Dvortsevoi, In the dark (2002) – commissioning editor Arte France
- Avi Mograbi, August, A moment before the eruption (2002) – commissioning editor Arte France
- Chantal Akerman, De l’autre côté (2002) – commissioning editor Arte France
- Chris Marker, Chats Perches (2004) – commissioning editor Arte France
- David Teboul, Bania (2005) – commissioning editor Arte France
- Lech Kowalski, East of paradise (2005) – commissioning editor Arte France
- Naomi Kawase, Tarachime (2006) – commissioning editor Arte France
- Naomi Kawase, Chiri (2012) – commissioning editor Arte France
- Apichatpong Weerasethakul, Mekong Hotel (2012) – commissioning editor Arte France
- Photo l’Integrale. Les Gands courants Photographiques, Une collection documentaire proposée par Luciano Rigolini, Arte France Editions, Paris (2009-2013)
- Tsai Ming-linag, Walker-Journey to the west (2014) – commissioning editor Arte France
- Laurie Anderson, Heart of a dog (2015) – commissioning editor Arte France
- Innocence of Memories (2015) – executive producer
