= The End of the World (1992 film) =

1992 film

- Directed by: João Mário Grilo
- Written by: João Mário Grilo; Paulo Filipe
- Produced by: Paulo Branco
- Starring: José Viana
- Cinematography: Antoine Héberlé
- Edited by: Carla Bogalheiro; Christian Dior
- Release date: 1992
- Running time: 64 minutes
- Country: Portugal
- Language: Portuguese

The End of the World (Portuguese: O Fim do Mundo) is a 1992 Portuguese drama film directed by João Mário Grilo. It was screened in the Un Certain Regard section at the 1993 Cannes Film Festival.

== Cast ==
- José Viana - Augusto Henriques
- Adelaide João - Conceição das Neves
- Zita Duarte - Violante
- Santos Manuel - Guard 1
- Heitor Lourenço - Guard 2
- João Lagarto - João
- Carlos Daniel - Carlos
- Alexandra Lencastre - Maria do Carmo
- Henrique Viana - Laureano
- Mário Jacques - Prosecutor
- Rui Mendes - Judge
- Maria João Luís - Alda
