= Uma Família Açoriana =

- Genre: Period
- Based on: Os Cantos by Maria Filomena Mónica
- Written by: João Nunes
- Starring: Nicolau Breyner; Maria João Luís; Nuno Gil; Duarte Guimarães; Maria Leite; Catarina Wallenstein
- Country of origin: Portugal
- Original language: Portuguese
- No. of seasons: 1
- No. of episodes: 8

Original release
- Network: RTP1
- Release: 13 October – 1 December 2013

Uma Família Açoriana (lit. An Azorean Family) is a Portuguese period television series broadcast by RTP. It first aired on RTP1 from 13 October 2013 to 1 December 2013.

== Plot ==
The series begins in 1876 and is set in the Azores.

== Cast ==
- Nicolau Breyner as Vasco Ataíde Camara
- Maria João Luís as Maria Isabel
- Nuno Gil as Pedro
- Duarte Guimarães as António
- Maria Leite as Margarida
- Catarina Wallenstein as Rose
- Frederico Amaral as Arthur Salgado
- Carlos Santos
- Manuel Wiborg
- Maria d´Aires
- Adriano Carvalho
- Agnelo Meneses
- Hugo Tavares
- Emanuel Macedo
- João Maria Pinto
