= Maria do Céu Guerra =

Portuguese actress (born 1943)

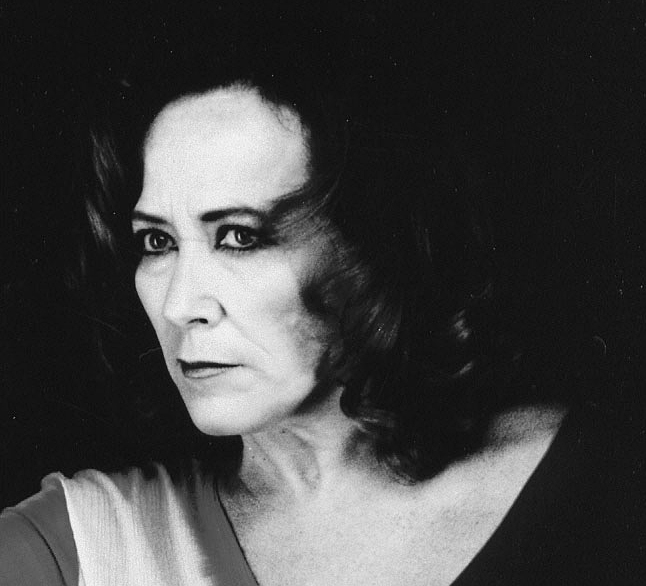
- Maria do Céu Guerra in 2007
- Born: 26 May 1943 (age 83); Lisbon, Portugal
- Occupation: Actress
- Years active: 1964-present

Maria do Céu Guerra (born 26 May 1943) is a Portuguese actress. She appeared in more than fifty films since 1964.

== Selected filmography ==
Film
Year	Title	Role	Notes
2004	Portugal S.A.		
2014	Cats Don't Have Vertigo		

TV
Year	Title	Role	Notes
2014-2015	Jardins Proibidos	Jacinta	
