= Sophia Awards =

Portuguese film award ceremony

- Current: 2021 Sophia Awards
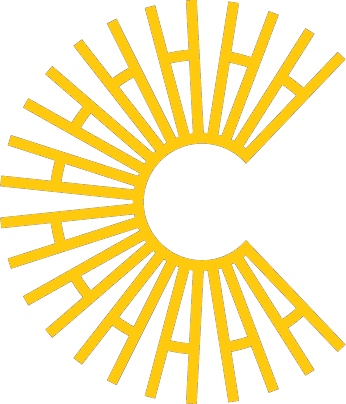
- The Sophia Award logo
- Awarded for: Achievements in Portuguese cinema
- Location: Casino Estoril
- Country: Portugal
- Presented by: Portuguese Academy of Cinema
- First award: 26 November 2012
- Website: http://www.academiadecinema.pt/

Television/radio coverage
- Network: RTP2

The Sophia Awards are the Portuguese cinematographic and film awards, assigned annually, which aim to recognize the best national productions. Its name was chosen in honor of the Portuguese poet and writer Sophia de Mello Breyner Andersen and also because "Sophia" is a classic Greek name which means "wisdom" .

== History ==
The awards were instituted in 2012, a year after the creation of the Portuguese Academy of Motion Picture Arts and Sciences. The president, Paulo Trancoso, said that the main idea was to create a form of recognizing and congratulate the excellence in cinema in the country having in mind other annual awards in Europe like the Goya Awards in Spain or the César Awards in France.

The first edition took place on November 26, 2012, at the Cinemateca Portuguesa, where three Career Awards were given to the film director and producer António da Cunha Teles, the filmmaker António de Macedo and the actress Isabel Ruth.

== List of ceremonies ==
Edition	Ceremony Date	Location	Host	Best Film	Broadcast
1st	November 26, 2012	Cinemateca Portuguesa	Paulo Trancoso and Anabela Teixeira	Not awarded	Official Website
2nd	October 6, 2013	Teatro Nacional de São Carlos	José Pedro Vasconcelos	Tabu	RTP2
3rd	October 8, 2014	Centro Cultural de Belém	Ana Sofia Martins	The Last Time I Saw Macao	Official Website
4th	April 2, 2015	Centro Cultural de Belém	Cláudia Semedo	Cats Don't Have Vertigo	RTP2
5th	May 13, 2016	Centro Cultural de Belém	Ana Bola	Impossible Love	RTP2
6th	March 22, 2017	Centro Cultural de Belém	Ana Bola	Letters from War	RTP2
7th	March 25, 2018	Casino Estoril	Manuel Marques	Saint George	RTP2
8th	March 24, 2019	Casino Estoril	Ana Bola	Rage	RTP2
9th	September 17, 2020	Casino Estoril	Ana Bola and Joana Pais de Brito	The Domain	RTP2
10th	September 19, 2021	Casino Estoril	Margarida Vila-Nova and Pedro Miguel Ribeiro	Listen	RTP2
11th	June 18, 2022	Casino Estoril	Margarida Vila-Nova and Pedro Miguel Ribeiro	The Last Bath	RTP2
12th	May 21, 2023	Casino Estoril		Alma Viva	

== Categories ==
The Sophia Awards are awarded in 22 categories, with a maximum of four candidates for each.

As of 2021:

- Best Film
- Best Director
- Best Original Screenplay
- Best Actor
- Best Actress
- Best Supporting Actor
- Best Supporting Actress
- Best Documentary Feature
- Best Cinematography
- Best Editing
- Best Sound
- Best Original Score
- Best Art Direction
- Best Characterization/Special Effects
- Best Costume Design
- Best Makeup and Hairstyling
- Best Series/Television film
- Best Live Action Short Film
- Best Documentary Short Film
- Best Animated Short Film
- Best Trailer
- Best Poster

The following are also assigned:

- Sophia Art and Technique Award
- Sophia Career Award
- Sophia Student Award
  - The Sophia Student Award stands out as it gets awarded after a submission and selection phase. The main goal is to encourage future cineasts and their education institutions to share their work.
