= João Pedro Rodrigues =

Portuguese film director

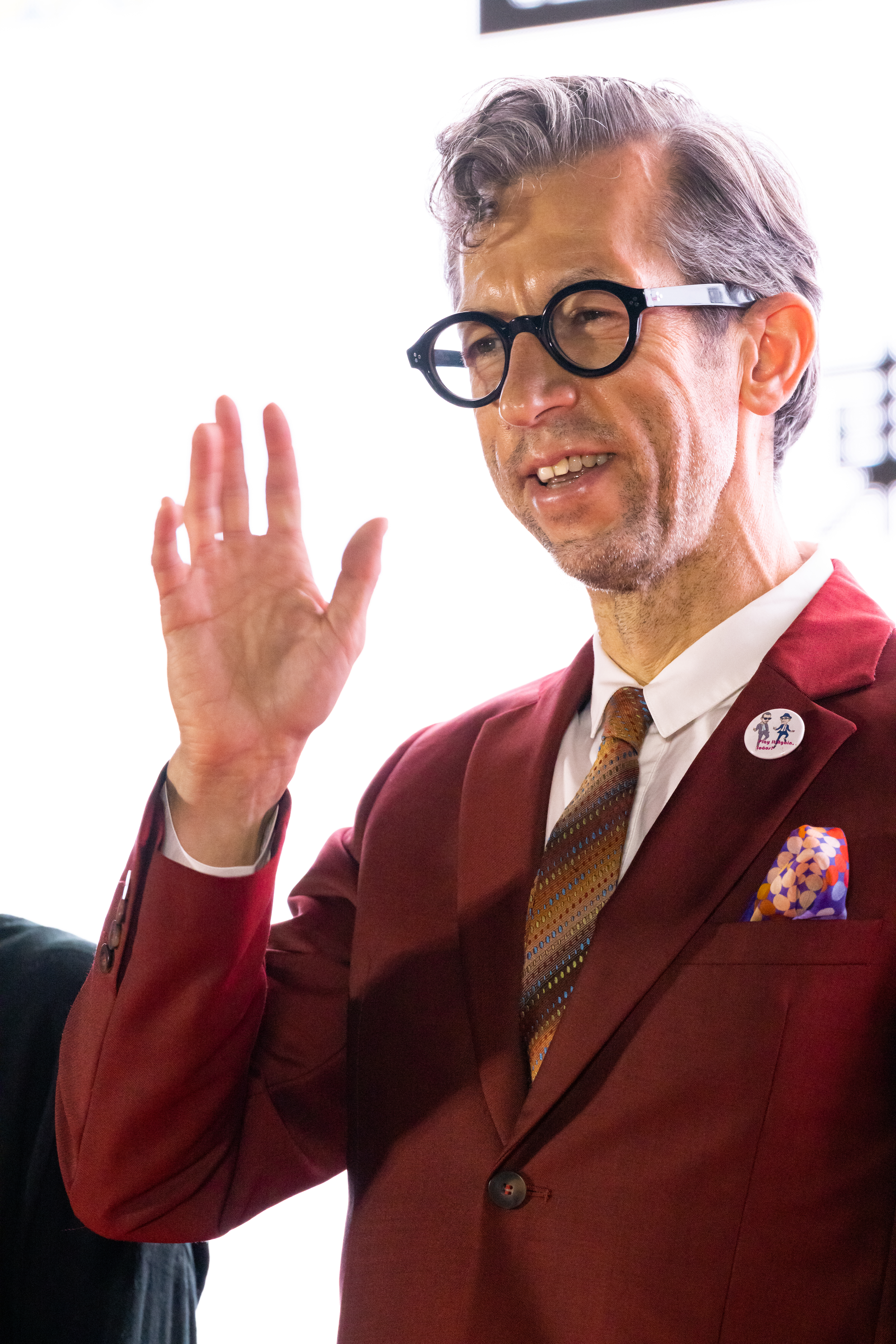
- Rodrigues in 2022
- Born: August 24, 1966 (age 60); Lisbon, Portugal
- Occupation: Filmmaker
- Years active: 1988–present

João Pedro Rodrigues (born 24 August 1966) is a Portuguese film director. He is considered to be part of The School of Reis.

== Career ==
Having studied at the School of Theatre and Cinema of Portugal, Rodrigues started his career as an assistant director and editor in several features, directed, for example, by Alberto Seixas Santos and Teresa Villaverde. In 1997, Rodrigues directed his first film O Fantasma (Phantom) (2000). Apart from the minor controversy it generated in Portugal, the film was shown in Spain, Italy, France, Brazil and the United States with modest results. Two Drifters (2005), his second feature film, garnered relative international acclaim and was shown at the Cannes Film Festival.

His features have been produced and released by the production company Rosa Filmes.

== Personal life ==
He is openly gay.

== Filmography ==
- 1988 - O Pastor
- 1997 - Happy Birthday! (Parabéns!)
- 1997 - Esta é a Minha Casa
- 1998 - A Trip to the Expo (Viagem à Expo)
- 2000 - O Fantasma
- 2005 - Two Drifters (Odete)
- 2007 - China China
- 2009 - To Die Like a Man (Morrer Como Um Homem)
- 2011 - Red Dawn (Alvorada Vermelha)
- 2012 - Manhã de Santo António
- 2012 - The Last Time I Saw Macao (A Última Vez Que Vi Macau)
- 2012 - The King's Body (O Corpo de Afonso)
- 2013 - Mahjong
- 2016 - The Ornithologist (O Ornitólogo)
- 2016 - Where Do You Stand Now, João Pedro Rodrigues? (Où en êtes-vous, João Pedro Rodrigues?)
- 2019 - 30/30 Vision: 3 Decades of Strand Releasing (segment "Potemkin Steps")
- 2022 - Will-o'-the-Wisp (Fogo-Fátuo)
