= The Girl from Nowhere (2012 film) =

2012 film by Jean-Claude Brisseau

- Theatrical release poster
- French: La Fille de nulle part
- Directed by: Jean-Claude Brisseau
- Written by: Jean-Claude Brisseau
- Produced by: Jean-Claude Brisseau
- Starring: Virginie Legeay; Claude Morel; Jean-Claude Brisseau; Lise Bellynck; Sébastien Bailly; Anne Berry; Emmanuel Noblet
- Cinematography: David Chambille
- Edited by: María Luisa García
- Production company: La Sorcière Rouge
- Distributed by: Les Acacias
- Release dates: 8 August 2012 (Locarno Festival); 6 February 2013 (France)
- Running time: 91 minutes
- Country: France
- Language: French

The Girl from Nowhere (French: La Fille de nulle part) is a 2012 French fantasy drama film written and directed by Jean-Claude Brisseau. The film had its world premiere on 8 August 2012 at the 65th Locarno Festival, where it won the Golden Leopard. It was released theatrically in France on 6 February 2013 by Les Acacias.

== Cast ==
- Virginie Legeay as Dora
- Claude Morel as Denis, the doctor friend
- Jean-Claude Brisseau as Michel Deviliers
- Lise Bellynck as Lise Villers, the former student
- Sébastien Bailly as the fool
- Anne Berry as death
- Emmanuel Noblet as performer
