= Quarta Divisão =

- Directed by: Joaquim Leitão
- Starring: Carla Chambel; Sabri Lucas; Paulo Pires; Cristina Câmara
- Release date: February 28, 2013 (Portugal)
- Country: Portugal
- Language: Portuguese

Quarta Divisão is a 2013 Portuguese film directed by Joaquim Leitão.

== Cast ==
- Carla Chambel
- Sabri Lucas
- Paulo Pires
- Cristina Câmara
