= Nicolau Breyner =

Portuguese actor, producer, director and television host (1940–2016)

Nicolau Breyner GOIH GOM
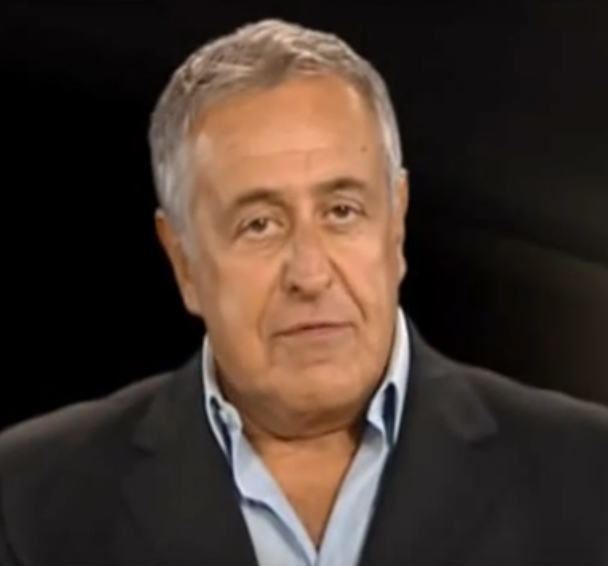
- Born: João Nicolau de Melo Breyner Moreira Lopes; 30 July 1940; Serpa, Portugal
- Died: 14 March 2016 (aged 75); Lisbon, Portugal
- Occupations: Actor, screenwriter, producer, director, television host
- Years active: 1964–2016

João Nicolau de Melo Breyner Moreira Lopes GOIH GOM (30 July 1940 – 14 March 2016), known professionally as Nicolau Breyner, was a Portuguese actor, screenwriter, producer, director and television host. He was one of the most well-known figures in Portuguese television and cinema, having performed in more than 170 films and television series in his career.

== Early life ==
Nicolau Breyner was born in Serpa, Portugal, on 30 July 1940. His parents were Nicolau Moreira Lopes (1915–1965) and Augusta Pereira da Silva de Melo Breyner Pereira (1920–2003).

Breyner and his family moved to Lisbon when he was 9 years old. There he studied at the Camões Secondary School. He studied singing and was part of the Portuguese Musical Youth chorus. He first enrolled in a Law school but later switched to vocal studies at the Conservatório Nacional. He initially pursued opera singing but opted for theater after finding that he did not have the discipline required for opera.

== Career ==
Breyner's acting debut in theater was in the play Leonor Telles by Marcelino Mesquita. His official acting career began in 1965 and did not end until his death. During this time, he went on to win two Portuguese Golden Globes and was nominated for five more. His highest rated film, Stefan Zweig, Farewell to Europe, where he played the character of Leopold Stern, went on to achieve a 90% rating from Rotten Tomatoes.

== Personal life ==
Breyner's first marriage was to Mafalda Maria de Alpoim Vieira Barbosa. His second marriage was to the Portuguese actress Sofia Sá da Bandeira, between 1996 and 2001. He had two daughters, Mariana and Constança Fidalgo Ramos de Melo Breyner Lopes, from a previous relationship with Cláudia Fidalgo. His third wife was Mafalda Gomes de Amorim Bessa.

Breyner was a second cousin of Portuguese author Sophia de Mello Breyner Andresen.

== Death ==
Breyner died in Lisbon from a cardiac arrest on 14 March 2016, aged 75. His body was cremated at the Alto de São João Cemetery in Lisbon.

== Selected filmography ==
Film
| Year | Title | Role | Notes |
|---|---|---|---|
| 1996 | Sostiene Pereira | Father António | |
| 1999 | Jaime | Coluna | |
| 1999 | Inferno | Nunes | |
| 2003 | Os Imortais | Joaquim Malarranha | |
| 2005 | O Crime do Padre Amaro | Father Francisco Dias | |
| 2007 | Corrupção | Sr. Presidente | |
| 2007 | Call Girl | Carlos Meireles | |
| 2010 | Despicable Me | Gru (Portuguese dubbing) | Voice acting |
| 2013 | Night Train to Lisbon | Silva | |
| 2013 | Despicable Me 2 | Gru (Portuguese dubbing) | Voice acting |
| 2015 | Minions | Young Gru (Portuguese dubbing) | Voice acting |

Television
| Year | Title | Role | Notes |
|---|---|---|---|
| 1975 | Nicolau no País das Maravilhas | Various | |
| 1980–1981 | Eu Show Nico | Various | |
| 1982 | Vila Faia | João Godunha | 100 episodes; also co-creator |
| 1982–1983 | Gente Fina é Outra Coisa | Horácio | 12 episodes |
| 1983–1984 | Origens | Luís Martinho | 120 episodes |
| 1987 | Palavras Cruzadas | João | 120 episodes; also director |
| 1988 | Os Homens da Segurança | Carlos Jorge | 13 episodes |
| 1988–1989 | Passerelle | Major Ilídio | 120 episodes |
| 1990 | Euronico | Various | 12 episodes |
| 1992–1993 | Cinzas | Securas | 150 episodes |
| 1993–1994 | Verão Quente | Luís Arruda | 130 episodes |
| 1993–1996 | Nico d'Obra | Nico | 122 episodes |
| 1996 | Primeiro Amor | Vítor Novais | 150 episodes |
| 1996–1997 | Reformado e Mal Pago | Artur | 26 episodes |
| 1997 | Vidas de Sal | Vasco Tavares | 78 episodes |
| 1998–1999 | Uma Casa em Fanicos | Nico | 39 episodes |
| 2002 | Fúria de Viver | Victor Antunes | 150 episodes |
| 2004 | A Ferreirinha | Forrester | 13 episodes |
| 2005 | Pedro e Inês | Afonso IV | 13 episodes |
| 2006–2008 | Aqui Não Há Quem Viva | João | 52 episodes |
| 2007 | Vingança | Alberto Lacerda | 213 episodes |
| 2009 | Equador | Mário Maltez | 23 episodes |
| 2009 | Morangos com Açúcar | Alexandre Peixoto | 79 episodes |
| 2009–2010 | Meu Amor | Caetano Vargas Moura | 348 episodes |
| 2013 | Uma Família Açoriana | José do Canto | 8 episodes |
| 2014 | O Beijo do Escorpião | Henrique de Albuquerque | 200 episodes |
| 2015 | Jardins Proibidos | Manuel Maria | 72 episodes |
| 2016 | A Impostora | Edmundo Gaspar | 81 episodes |
| 2016 | A Casa é Minha | Custódio | 20 episodes |
