= Transe =

- Directed by: Teresa Villaverde
- Starring: Ana Moreira
- Production company: Clap Filmes
- Release date: 2006
- Country: Portugal
- Languages: German, Italian, Portuguese, Russian

Transe is a 2006 Portuguese film directed by Teresa Villaverde. It won a Special Jury Award at the 2007 Lecce European Film Festival.

== Plot ==
Sonia is a young woman from St. Petersburg. After her personal and work life fall apart, she leaves Russia in search of a better life.

She eventually arrives in Germany and finds an undeclared job at a car dealership. One day, an individual comes to her work, telling that the other immigrants have been taken by the authorities. Promising to help her get her passport, Sonia gets into the car with him. After falling asleep, another man enters the car and begins driving.

With the situation still unclear, he lets her out, but she is left in the wilderness. Still in the forest and unconscious, she is picked up by the same person, who locks her naked in a bathroom until she pleads for help. When he finally lets her out, he proceeds to rape her as she tries to warm herself under a bed's covers. He then tells her that he has no other choice but to sell her to an Italian mafia.

In Italy, Sonia is kept against her will to work as a prostitute. She is abused due to her reluctance to participate and is unable to communicate as everyone only speaks Italian. Sonia eventually retreats into herself and refuses to eat and drink. Due to her resistance, she is sold to a wealthy family.

She is now kept locked in a room of a villa. The father keeps the only key to her room and presents her to his two sons, the youngest being mentally handicapped. One night, the older one steals the key and rapes Sonia in front of his brother, who tries to stop him. Another night, the younger one steals the key and speaks with Sonia, who convinces him to let her flee.

Possibly because of her escape, she's forced to endure bestiality in a secluded place by another group of people. Finally, still captive, and seemingly losing her mind, she speaks with a last man and lies down on his bed.

== Cast ==
- Ana Moreira, Sónia
- Viktor Rakov
- Robinson Stévenin
- Iaia Forte
- Andrey Chadov
- Filippo Timi
- Dinara Droukarova
- Io Appolloni
- Ronaldo Bonacchi
- Pedro Giestas
- Eunice Gomes
