= Ana Moreira =

Portuguese actress

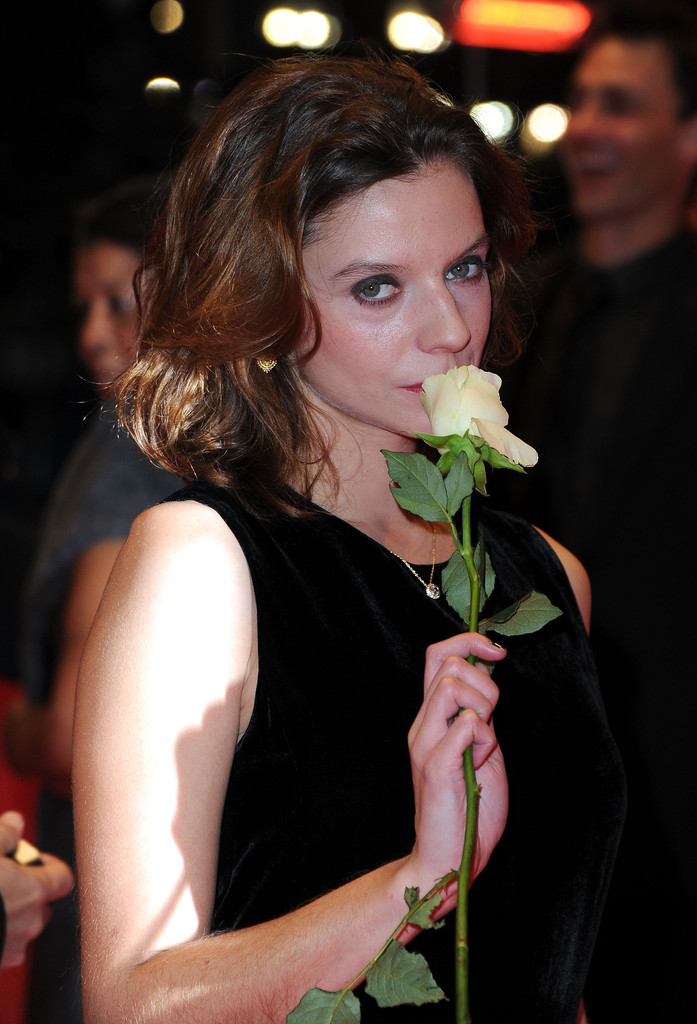
- Born: 13 February 1980 (age 46); Lisbon, Portugal
- Occupation: Actress
- Years active: 1997–present

Ana Moreira (born 13 February 1980) is a Portuguese actress. She has appeared in more than 20 films since 1997. She starred in The Mutants, which was screened in the Un Certain Regard section at the 1998 Cannes Film Festival.

== Selected filmography ==
- The Mutants (1998)
- Too Late (2000)
- Water and Salt (2001)
- Rasganço (2001)
- O Fascínio (2003)
- Adriana (2005)
- Pedro e Inês (2005, TV series)
- O Capacete Dourado (2006)
- Transe (2006)
- Histórias de Alice (2007)
- L'Arc-en-Ciel (2009)
- A Corte do Norte (2009)
- La Religieuse portugaise (2009)
- Tabu (2012)
