= Peter Bieri (author) =

Swiss writer and philosopher (1944–2023)

- Born: 23 June 1944; Bern, Switzerland
- Died: 27 June 2023 (aged 79); Berlin, Germany
- Education: Heidelberg University
- Occupations: Writer, philosopher
- Writing career
- Pen name: Pascal Mercier

Peter Bieri (23 June 1944 – 27 June 2023), better known by his pseudonym, Pascal Mercier, was a Swiss writer and philosopher.

== Academic background ==
Bieri studied philosophy, English studies and Indian studies in both London and Heidelberg. He took his doctoral degree in Heidelberg in 1971 after studies with Dieter Henrich and Ernst Tugendhat on the philosophy of time, with reference to the work of J. M. E. McTaggart. After the conferral of his doctorate, Bieri followed an academic career at the University of California, Berkeley, Harvard University, the Institute for Advanced Study, Berlin and the Van Leer Jerusalem Institute. In 1983 he started work at the University of Bielefeld and later he worked as a scientific assistant at the Philosophical Seminar at University of Heidelberg.

Bieri co-founded the research unit for Cognition and Brain studies at the German Research Foundation. The focuses of his research were the philosophy of mind, epistemology, and ethics. From 1990 to 1993, he was a professor of the history of philosophy at the University of Marburg; from 1993 he taught philosophy at the Free University of Berlin while holding the chair of analytic philosophy, succeeding his mentor, Ernst Tugendhat.

In 2007 he retired early, disillusioned by academic life and condemning what he saw as the rise of managerialism ("Eine Diktatur der Geschäftigkeit") and decline in respect for academic work.

== Pseudonym and work as a writer ==
As a writer, Bieri used the pseudonym Pascal Mercier, made up of the surnames of the two French philosophers Blaise Pascal and Louis-Sébastien Mercier. Martin Halter, in Frankfurter Allgemeine Zeitung, criticized Bieri's attempt "to dress up the trite man from Bern in a French philosopher's lace jabot" as a pretentious mannerism. Peter Bieri published five novels. Writing literature was to him a revelation of the writer's soul through moods: "An atmosphere – that is absolutely the most important thing in a book and it will reveal, like nothing else, the author's soul." Reviewers identified “heart, woe and a lot of fate” as “his recipe for success” which Bieri, aiming at “wellness literature”, applied in each of his books with little variation.

== Death ==
Bieri died on 27 June 2023 in Berlin, at the age of 79.

== Awards and recognition ==
- Lichtenberg Medal 2006
- Marie-Luise-Kaschnitz Prize 2006
- Honorary Doctorate University of Lucerne 2010

== Works ==
=== Philosophical works ===
- Peter Bieri: Das Handwerk der Freiheit. Hanser, Munich 2001. ISBN 978-3-446-20070-8
- Peter Bieri: Eine Art zu Leben. Hanser, 2013. ISBN 978-3-446-24349-1

A full list of his philosophical works may be found on Wikipedia's German pages.

=== Novels ===
- Pascal Mercier: Perlmanns Schweigen, English Perlmann's Silence. Albrecht Knaus, Munich 1995. ISBN 3-442-72135-0
- Pascal Mercier: Der Klavierstimmer. Albrecht Knaus, Munich 1998. ISBN 3-442-72654-9
- Pascal Mercier: Nachtzug nach Lissabon, English Night Train to Lisbon. Hanser, Munich 2004. ISBN 3-446-20555-1, English ISBN 978-0-8021-4397-6
- Pascal Mercier: Lea (Novelle). Hanser, Munich 2007. ISBN 978-3-446-20915-2, English ISBN 978-1-8488-7341-4
- Pascal Mercier: Das Gewicht der Worte. Hanser, Munich 2020. ISBN 978-3-446-26569-1
