= Teresa Villaverde =

Portuguese film director (born 1966)

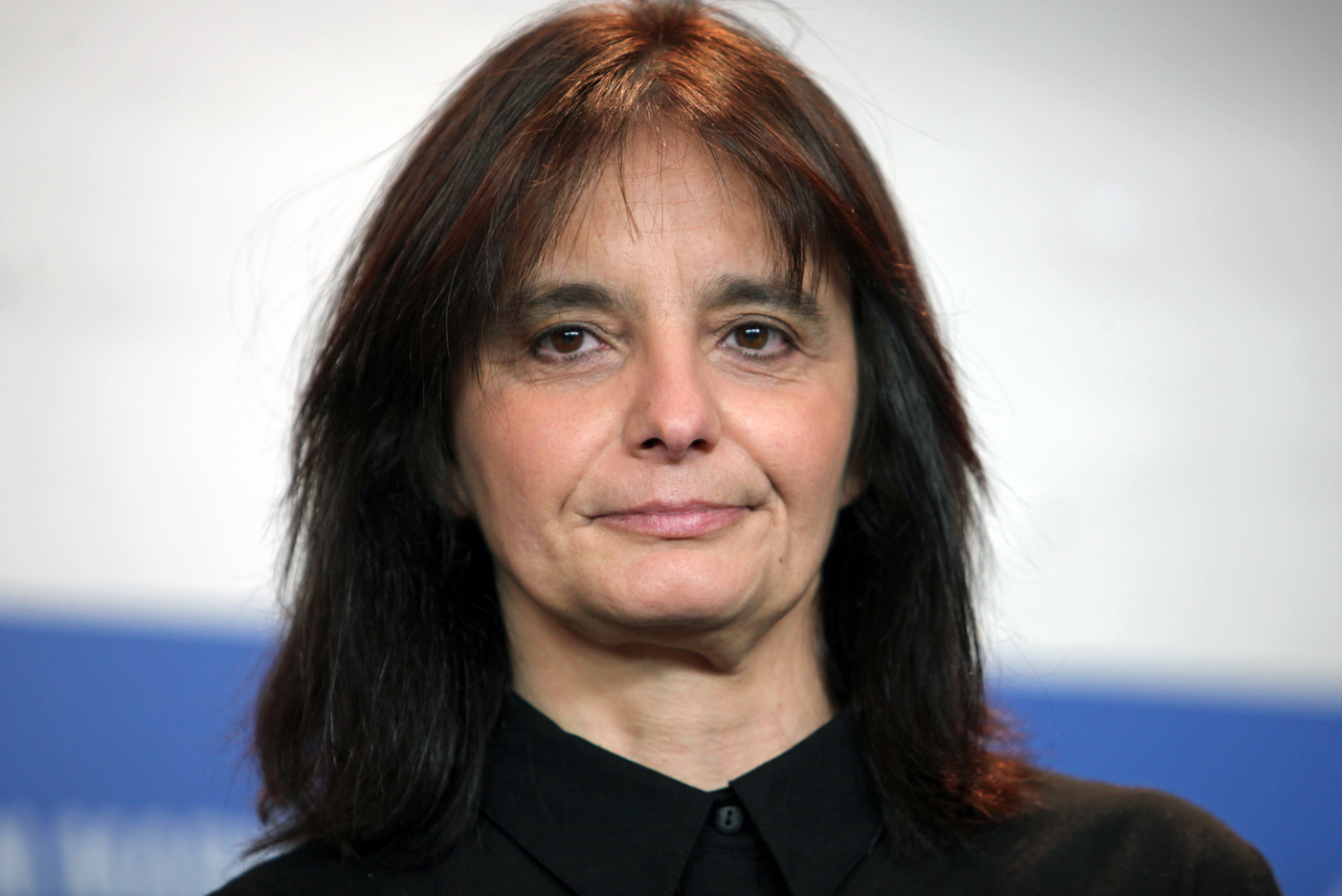
- Villaverde in 2017
- Born: Teresa Villaverde Cabral; May 18, 1966 (age 60); Lisbon, Portugal
- Occupations: Film director, screenwriter
- Years active: 1990–present

Teresa Villaverde (born 18 May 1966) is a Portuguese film director. Her film Os Mutantes was screened in the Un Certain Regard section at the 1998 Cannes Film Festival.

== Filmography ==
- A Idade Maior (1991)
- Três Irmãos (1994)
- Os Mutantes (1998)
- Water and Salt (2001)
- A Favor da Claridade (2004)
- Visions of Europe (2004)
- Transe (2006)
- Swan (2011)
- Bridges of Sarajevo (2014)
- Paris 15/16
- Colo (2017)
- O Termometro de Galileu (2018)
- Six Portraits of Pain (2019)
- Où en êtes-vou, Teresa Villaverde? (2019)

== Awards ==
- Nominated for the Golden Globe, Portugal in 1999 for Best Director in Os Mutantes.
- Nominated for the Golden Globe, Portugal in 1999 for Best Film in Os Mutantes.
- Nominated for the Golden Globe, Portugal in 2007 for Best Film in Transe.
