= The Last Time I Saw Macao =

- Portuguese: A Última Vez Que Vi Macau
- Directed by: João Pedro Rodrigues; João Rui Guerra da Mata
- Produced by: João Figueiras; Daniel Chabannes; Corentin Sénéchal
- Starring: Cindy Scrash; João Pedro Rodrigues; João Rui Guerra da Mata
- Edited by: Raphaël Lefèvre; João Pedro Rodrigues; João Rui Guerra da Mata
- Distributed by: Epicentre Films
- Release date: 6 August 2012 (Locarno Film Festival)
- Running time: 82 minutes
- Countries: Portugal, Macau, France
- Languages: Portuguese, English, Mandarin

The Last Time I Saw Macao (Portuguese: A Última Vez Que Vi Macau) is a 2012 Portuguese film directed by João Pedro Rodrigues and João Rui Guerra da Mata. It competed for the Golden Leopard at the 2012 Locarno International Film Festival. It was shot in Macau.

== Synopsis ==
Thirty years after leaving Macao for Lisbon, Guerra da Mata returns to his hometown, at the request of Candy, a transvestite whose questionable associations make him fear for his life. As soon as he arrives at the hotel, Guerra da Mata receives a call from a frightened Candy, asking him to urgently join his friend A-Kan in front of a sex shop downtown. Arriving too late at the meeting, Guerra da Mata loses track of Candy.
