= Barcia =

Barcia is a Spanish surname. Notable people with the surname include:

- Andrés González de Barcia (1673–1743), Spanish historian and one of the founders of the Royal Spanish Academy
- Augusto Barcia (1926–2001), Chilean painter
- Augusto Barcia Trelles (1881–1961), Spanish politician
- Baltasar Barcia (born 2001), Uruguayan footballer
- Camilo Barcia García-Villamil (1937–2018), Spanish diplomat and economist
- Dani Barcia (born 2003), Spanish footballer
- Francisco Barcia (born 1966), Spanish wrestler
- Gabriel Barcia-Colombo (born 1982), American video artist and filmmaker
- Gerard Barcia (born 1963), Andorran trap shooter
- Giovanni Barcia (1829–1912), Italian Catholic bishop
- James Barcia (born 1952), American politician
- Joana Bárcia (born 1972), Portuguese actress and director
- José Rubia Barcia (1914–1997), Spanish literary critic and translator
- Juan Barcia Caballero (1852–1926), Spanish physician and writer
- Juan Ignacio Duato Bárcia (born 1957), Spanish modern ballet dancer and choreographer
- Juan Pablo Barcia (born 1976), Spanish disability athlete
- Justin Barcia (born 1992), American motorcycle racer
- Leandro Barcia (born 1992), Uruguayan footballer
- Manuel Barcia (born 1972), Pro-Vice-Chancellor at the University of Bath
- Mario Barcia (born 1989), Argentine footballer
- Robert Barcia (1928–2009), French politician
- Roberto Caldeyro-Barcia (1921–1996), Uruguayan doctor
- Roque Barcia (1821–1885), Spanish writer and politician
- Sergio Barcia (born 2000), Spanish footballer
- Steve Barcia, game programmer, game producer and entrepreneur

== See also ==
- Barcia CF, Spanish football club
