= Clara Joana =

Portuguese actress (1941–2026)

Clara Joana de Oliveira Vitorino
- Born: 4 August 1941; Lisbon, Portugal
- Died: 17 October 2026 (aged 85); Lisbon, Portugal
- Occupation: Actress
- Years active: 1961–2019

Clara Joana de Oliveira Vitorino (4 August 1941 – 17 October 2026), known by her stage name Clara Joana, was a Portuguese film, stage and television actress.

== Early life ==
Joana, was born in the Portuguese capital of Lisbon, on 4 August 1941, into a theatrical family. Her father was an actor. Interested, therefore, in the theatre from a young age, she performed first in high school and in amateur groups. In 1959, she enrolled in the Faculty of Letters at the University of Lisbon and at the National Conservatory, but did not complete courses at either of them.

== Career ==
Having worked with Pedro Bom, pseudonym of José Manuel da Fonseca, a translator, playwright and director, who had founded the Lisbon Experimental Theatre Group, Joana began her professional theatrical career in 1961, performing at the National Cultural Centre. The Centre had become a meeting place for dialogue between the various political and ideological sectors during the Estado Novo era, including figures who are today a reference in Portuguese culture, such as Sophia de Mello Breyner Andresen and Helena Vaz da Silva. Joana performed in Fernando Pessoa's The Sailor, directed by Fernando Amado. This proved very popular and was even transferred to Rio de Janeiro in 1962.

Joana then performed with the Teatro Moderno theatre group, which played at the Cinema Império in Lisbon until the group's closure in 1965, with roles in the plays O Tinteiro by Carlos Muñiz, directed by Rogério Paulo; Humiliated and Insulted by André Charpak, based on the novel of the same name by Fyodor Dostoevsky, and Three Top Hats by Miguel Mihura, both directed by Fernando Gusmão. Other plays she performed in while at the theatre group included Arthur Adamov's, Professor Taranne, August Strindberg's Pariah, Luiz Francisco Rebello's The Day After (all three directed by Paulo Renato), Shakespeare's Measure for Measure, directed by António Pedro, and José Cardoso Pires' The Surrender of Heroes, directed by Gusmão.

She made her first film in 1962 with Bread, Love and... Totobola!, directed by Henrique Campos. In 1965, she worked with Francisco Ribeiro on a commemorative show for the 500th anniversary of the birth of the Gil Vicente, who is considered the "father of Portuguese drama". From this, António Lopes Ribeiro would make the film Gil Vicente and His Theatre. In 1966, she received a scholarship from the Calouste Gulbenkian Foundation to attend the Centre Dramatique de L'Est in Strasbourg, France. She returned to Portugal in 1968, working on films such as A Ilha dos Amores and O Desejado, directed by Paulo Rocha, Azul Azul by José de Sá Caetano, and Sinais de Vida by Luís Filipe Rocha. She was also part of several television series in Portugal and Le Triplé Gagnant in France in 1989, as well as the Portuguese television version of The Trial of Joan of Arc in which she was directed by František Listopad.

In the 1990s, Joana continued to participate in film and television. She was part of Amor e Dedinhos de Pé (1992) as well as Sinais de Fogo, an adaptation of the novel by Jorge de Sena, both directed by Rocha, and Adam and Eve (1995), directed by Joaquim Leitão. In 1997, she also participated in Tentação with the same director. On television, she was part of several productions including Aquela Cativa Que Me Tem Cativo (1995), a miniseries in which she played Catherine of Austria, Queen of Portugal. Her last film was in 2019.

== Death ==
Joana died in Lisbon on 17 October 2026, at the age of 85. She was interred in Carnide cemetery, Lisbon.
