= A Ilha dos Amores =

1982 film

A Ilha dos Amores (The Island of Love)
- Directed by: Paulo Rocha
- Written by: Wenceslau De Moraes; Sumiko Haneda; Jorge L. Neto; Paulo Rocha
- Produced by: Paulo Rocha; Etsuko Takano
- Starring: Luís Miguel Cintra
- Cinematography: Acácio de Almeida
- Release date: May 1982
- Running time: 170 minutes
- Countries: Portugal; Japan
- Languages: Portuguese; Japanese

A Ilha dos Amores (Japanese: 恋の浮島, romanized: Koi no ukishima) is a 1982 Portuguese-Japanese drama film directed by Paulo Rocha. It was entered into the 1982 Cannes Film Festival.

The film follows the life and loves of Portuguese writer and Navy officer Wenceslau de Moraes in Macau and Japan. The filmmaker plays the role of poet Camilo Pessanha.

The film is structured following The Nine Songs by the Chinese poet Qu Yuan.

== Cast ==
- Luís Miguel Cintra as Wenceslau de Moraes
- Clara Joana as Isabel / Venus
- Zita Duarte as Francesca
- Jorge Silva Melo as Painter
- Paulo Rocha as Camilo Pessanha
- Yoshiko Mita as O-Yoné
- Atsuko Murakumo as Ko-Haru
- Jun Toyokawa as Asatarô
- Erl Tenni as Atchan
- Lai Wang as Chinese mother
