= Sumiko =

- Gender: Female

Origin
- Origin: Japanese
- Meaning: Different meanings depending on the kanji used

Sumiko (written: すみこ, 純子, 澄子, 寿美子, 須美子, スミ子 or すみ子) is a feminine Japanese given name. Notable people with the name include:

- Princess Sumiko (1829–1881) Japanese princess
- Sumiko Fuji (富司 純子; born 1945), Japanese actress
- Sumiko Gutiérrez (born 1988), Mexican professional footballer
- Sumiko Haneda (羽田 澄子; born 1926), Japanese film director
- Sumiko Hennessy (born 1937), Japanese-American social worker and academic
- Sumiko Hidaka (日高 澄子; 1923–2002), Japanese actress
- Sumiko Inaba (born 1991), American mixed martial artist
- Sumiko Iwao (岩男 寿美子; 1935–2018), Japanese psychologist, magazine editor and academic
- Sumiko Kitada (北田 スミ子; 1962), Japanese badminton player
- Sumiko Kurishima (栗島 すみ子; 1902–1987), Japanese actress and dancer
- Sumiko Mizukubo (水久保 澄子; 1916–?), Japanese actress
- Sumiko Sakamoto (坂本 スミ子; 1936–2021), Japanese singer and actress
- Sumiko Shirakawa (白川 澄子; 1935–2015), Japanese voice actress
- Sumiko Takahara (高原 須美子; 1933-2001), Japanese economist
- Sumiko Watanabe (渡辺 すみ子; 1916–2010), Japanese sprinter
- Sumiko Yokoyama (横山 寿美子; born 1974), Japanese cross-country skier

== See also ==
- 4100 Sumiko, a main-belt asteroid
