= List of shipwrecks in March 1876 =

The list of shipwrecks in March 1876 includes ships sunk, foundered, grounded, or otherwise lost during March 1876.

== 1 March ==
List of shipwrecks: 1 March 1876
Ship	State	Description
Anna Jansen	Denmark	The ship was driven ashore near "Hjehnen". She was on a voyage from Newcastle upon Tyne, Northumberland, United Kingdom to Fredericia. She was refloated and taken in to Aarhus.
Argyle	United Kingdom	The steamship ran aground at Dunfanaghy, County Donegal. She was on a voyage from Londonderry to Ballyness, County Donegal.
Bengairn	United Kingdom	The brig ran aground in the Boqueron Passage. She was on a voyage from Glasgow, Renfrewshire to Callao, Peru. She was refloated the next day and towed in to Callao.
Confidence	United Kingdom	The brigantine was driven ashore and damaged near Ballyness. She was on a voyage from Ballyness to London.
Czar	United Kingdom	The full-rigged ship ran aground on the Gabbard Sand, in the North Sea off the coast of Suffolk. She was refloated and resumed her voyage.
Glenaray	United Kingdom	The ship was driven ashore and wrecked at Brook, Isle of Wight. Her crew were rescued by the Coastguard using rocket apparatus, but one crewman died after reaching shore. Glenaray was on a voyage from Adelaide, South Australia to London.
Matin	United Kingdom	The steamship ran aground on the Maplin Sand, in the North Sea off the coast of Essex. She was on a voyage from Newcastle upon Tyne, Northumberland to London. she was refloated and resumed her voyage.
Margaret McColl	United Kingdom	The ship was driven ashore and wrecked on Berman Head, Isle of Arran. Her crew survived. She was on a voyage from Larne, County Antrim to Rothesay, Isle of Bute.
Nuova Ottavia	Italy	The barque stranded off Currituck Beach, North Carolina with the loss of nine of her crew, plus the three crewmen of the No. 4 Life Saving Station, and one man from the Currituck Beach Light were lost. Four crewmen washed ashore on wreckage alive. Nuova Ottavia was on a voyage from Genoa to Baltimore, Maryland, United States. She was a total loss.
Urd	Norway	The ship ran aground at Sunderland, County Durham, United Kingdom. She was on a voyage from Frederikshald to Sunderland. She was refloated and found to be leaky.
Young John	United Kingdom	The ship was driven ashore at Stone Ends, Cambridgeshire. She was on a voyage from King's Lynn, Norfolk to Wisbech, Cambridgeshire.
Unnamed	United States	The lifeboat capsized off the coast of North Carolina with the los of four lives whilst going to the assistance of the barque Nuova Ottavia (Italy), which was in distress.

== 2 March ==
List of shipwrecks: 2 March 1876
Ship	State	Description
Faraday	United Kingdom	The steamship was driven ashore and damaged at Whitehead, Nova Scotia, Canada. She was refloated and taken in to Halifax, Nova Scotia.
Susanne	Germany	The barque was run into by the steamship Sandringham (United Kingdom) and sank in the Elbe. She was on a voyage from Hamburg to the Amoor River.

== 3 March ==
List of shipwrecks: 3 March 1876
Ship	State	Description
Attaliah	United Kingdom	The brig ran aground on the Whiting Sand, in the North Sea off the coast of Suffolk. She was on a voyage from South Shields, County Durham to London. She was refloated and beached at Harwich, Essex.
Carrier Dove	United States	The Montell & Company-owned clipper ran aground at Stone Horse Shoals, near Tybee Island, Georgia and was abandoned by her crew. She was on a voyage from Liverpool, Lancashire to Tybee Island.
Carrier Dove	Canada	The schooner was swept from her moorings and dragged underneath another schooner on the American side of Lake Ontario.
Columbine	United Kingdom	The ship was abandoned in the Atlantic Ocean. Her seventeen crew were rescued by the steamship Somerset (United Kingdom). Columbine was on a voyage from Pensacola, Florida to Greenock, Renfrewshire.
Glenlivet	United Kingdom	The ship was driven ashore near Carrickfergus, County Antrim. She was refloated on 10 March and towed in to Carrickfergus.
Great Britain	United Kingdom	The ship capsized with the loss of fifteen of her crew. Survivors were taken off the wreck on 11 March by Greta (United Kingdom). Great Britain was on a voyage from Doboy, Georgia, United States to Liverpool, Lancashire.
Helens	United Kingdom	The ship ran aground at Amoy, China. She was refloated and placed under repair.
Theton	Germany	The ship was driven ashore and wrecked at Cimbritshamn, Sweden. She was on a voyage from Memel to Hartlepool, Country Durham.

== 4 March ==
List of shipwrecks: 4 March 1876
Ship	State	Description
Anna Maria	United Kingdom	The trow capsized in the Bristol Channel. Her crew were rescued. She was on a voyage from Troon, Ayrshire to Lydney, Gloucestershire. She was subsequently beached.
Arriero	United Kingdom	The brigantine was driven ashore and wrecked on Rathlin Island, County Donegal. Her crew were rescued.
Iona	United Kingdom	The schooner was driven ashore and wrecked at Formby, Lancashire with the loss of her captain. Three survivors were rescued by the Formby Lifeboat. She was on a voyage from Bridgwater, Somerset to Liverpool, Lancashire.
Maria	United Kingdom	The schooner was destroyed by fire off Montrose, Forfarshire. Her five crew were rescued by the Coastguard.
Nautilus	United Kingdom	The steam flat sprang a leak sank in the River Mersey off New Ferry, Cheshire. No crew were aboard at the time.
Sarah Jane	United Kingdom	The brigantine was abandoned in the North Sea off the Dudgeon Lightship ( Trinity House). Her crew were rescued by the steamship Wear (United Kingdom).
Trusty	United Kingdom	The trow sank in the Swash, off the coast of Somerset. Her crew were rescued. She was on a voyage from Bristol, Gloucestershire to Gloucester.

== 5 March ==
List of shipwrecks: 5 March 1876
Ship	State	Description
Ipswich	United Kingdom	The barque was driven ashore on Baltrum, Germany. Her seven crew were rescued. She was on a voyage from Hartlepool, County Durham to Bremerhaven, Germany.
John Geddie	United Kingdom	The ship caught fire at Charleston, South Carolina, United States and was scuttled. She was on a voyage from Charleston to Liverpool, Lancashire. She was refloated in late March.
Sireneham Marstrom	(Russian Empire) Grand Duchy of Finland	The barque was abandoned at sea. Her crew were rescued by Hedwig Zabel (Germany). Sireneham Marstrom was on a voyage from Newcastle upon Tyne, Northumberland, United Kingdom to Reval, Russia. She was taken in to Lysekil, Norway in a derelict condition.

== 6 March ==
List of shipwrecks: 6 March 1876
Ship	State	Description
Chatham	Norway	The barque was abandoned in the Atlantic Ocean. Her crew were rescued by the steamship St. Louis (United Kingdom), which put seven of her crew aboard with the intention of taking her in to Liverpool, Lancashire, United Kingdom. She arrived at Falmouth, Cornwall, United Kingdom in early April.
Dronning Sophie	Norway	The barque ran aground at Vlissingen, Zeeland, Netherlands. She was on a voyage from New York, United States to Antwerp, Belgium.
Falke	Germany	The steamship ran aground near Bremen. She was on a voyage from Bremen to Hull, Yorkshire, United Kingdom.
George Lock	United Kingdom	The jigger smack was wrecked at Helmsdale, Sutherland. Her crew were rescued.
Halvmaanen	Norway	The brigantine was driven ashore on Hirsholmene. She was on a voyage from Alloa, Clackmannanshire, United Kingdom to Karrebæksminde, Denmark. She was refloated and taken in to Fredrikshavn, Denmark in a severely leaky condition.
Industry	United Kingdom	The ship sank in the Swash, off the coast of Somerset. Her crew were rescued. She was on a voyage from Troon, Ayrshire to Bristol, Gloucestershire.
Nettle	United States	The brigantine ran aground at Gibraltar. She was on a voyage from New York to Gibraltar. She was refloated.
Old Dominion	United States	The barque collided with a frigate and was beached at Vlissingen. She was on a voyage from Antwerp to Philadelphia, Pennsylvania.
Walker Hall	United Kingdom	The ship was abandoned off Thurso, Caithness. Her eleven crew were rescued by the Thurso Lifeboat Charley Lloyd ( Royal National Lifeboat Institution). Walker Hall was on a voyage from Leith, Lothian to Lisbon, Portugal. She was subsequently driven ashore and wrecked at Clarendon Head, Caithness.

== 7 March ==
List of shipwrecks: 7 March 1876
Ship	State	Description
Camelford	United Kingdom	The schooner ran aground on the Doom Bar and was wrecked with the loss of a crew member. Survivors were rescued by rocket apparatus and breeches buoy. She was on a voyage from Cardiff, Glamorgan to Saint Lucia.
Orestes	United Kingdom	The steamship ran aground on the Grindura Reef, off the coast of Ceylon and sank. All on board were rescued. She was on a voyage from Liverpool, Lancashire to China.

== 8 March ==
List of shipwrecks: 8 March 1876
Ship	State	Description
Aurora Australis	United Kingdom	The barque was driven ashore and wrecked in Tramore Bay. Her crew were rescued. She was on a voyage from Java, Netherlands East Indies to Queenstown, County Cork.
Britannic	United Kingdom	The steamship caught fire at Belfast, County Antrim. The fire was extingusihed.
Disco	United States	The ship was damaged by fire at Amsterdam, North Holland, Netherlands. She was on a voyage from Savannah, Georgia to Amsterdam.
Garland	United Kingdom	The schooner was driven ashore and wrecked on Molène, Finistère, France. Her crew were rescued.
Ontario	United Kingdom	The ship was driven ashore and wrecked at Long Beach, New Jersey, United States. Her crew were rescued.
Polar Star	United Kingdom	The brig was driven ashore and wrecked on the north coast of Skagen, Denmark. Her crew were rescued.
Samanoue	(Ottoman Empire) Egypt	The steamship suffered a boiler explosion at Suez with the loss of 24 lives. She was on a voyage from Suez to Massowah.
William	United Kingdom	The fishing smack ran aground on the North Dogger, in the Irish Sea off the coast of County Wexford. Her crew were rescued by the Rosslare Lifeboat.

== 10 March ==
List of shipwrecks: 10 March 1876
Ship	State	Description
Anna Marie	United Kingdom	The schooner foundered on the Dogger Bank. Her crew were rescued by the smack Superior (United Kingdom). Anna Marie was on a voyage from Boston, Lincolnshire to Hull, Yorkshire.
Elizabeth	United Kingdom	The schooner was wrecked at Cromarty. Her crew were rescued. She was on a voyage from Helmsdale, Sutherland to Stettin, Germany.
Experiment	United Kingdom	The smack departed from Plymouth for Kingsbridge, Devon. No further trace, presumed foundered with the loss of both crew.
Slains Castle	United Kingdom	The ship was driven onto the Pwllchrochan Flats, off the coast of Pembrokeshire.
Unnamed	France	The ship ran aground on the Blackshaw Bank, in the Irish Sea off the coast of Wigtownshire, United Kingdom. Her twenty crew survived.

== 11 March ==
List of shipwrecks: 11 March 1876
Ship	State	Description
Cowslip	United Kingdom	The barque was driven ashore at Dungeness, Kent. She was oon a voyage from South Shields, County Durham to Genoa, Italy. She was refloated and taken in to Ramsgate, Kent, where she arrived on 14 March.
Marie Georgiana	United Kingdom	The ship was driven ashore at Figueira da Foz, Portugal. She was refloated and found to be leaky. She was taken in to Figueria da Foz for repairs.
Thomas and Kate	(United Kingdom of Great Britain and Ireland) Jersey	The ship was driven ashore and wrecked at Bridport, Dorset. Her crew were rescued by the Coastguard.

== 12 March ==
List of shipwrecks: 12 March 1876
Ship	State	Description
Adelaide	France	The schooner ran aground and was wrecked at Arklow, County Wicklow, United Kingdom.
Ami	France	The brig ran aground on the Goodwin Sands, Kent, United Kingdom. Her eight crew were rescued by the Ramsgate Lifeboat Bradford ( Royal National Lifeboat Institution).
Athlete	United Kingdom	The brigantine foundered in the English Channel off Portland, Dorset with the loss of seven of the eight people on board. The survivor was rescued by Amelia (United Kingdom). Athlete was on a voyage from London to Sligo.
Barbara	United Kingdom	The brig was sighted in the North Sea off the Corton Lightship ( Trinity House) whilst on a voyage from Seaham, County Durham to London. No further trace, presumed foundered with the loss of all hands.
Caroline Lawson	United Kingdom	The ship caught fire and sank at Oran, Algeria.
Charlotte	United Kingdom	The ship ran aground and sank off Clacton-on-Sea, Essex. Her crew were rescued by the Coastguard. She was on a voyage from Seaham to London.
Edith	United Kingdom	The fishing vessel was driven ashore at Dover, Kent. She was refloated with the assistance of the Dover Lifeboat Royal Wiltshire ( Royal National Lifeboat Institution) and assisted in to Dover.
Eumenides	United Kingdom	The full-rigged ship capsized in the Atlantic Ocean 200 nautical miles (370 km) off Cape Clear Island, County Cork with the loss of thirteen of her 22 crew. Survivors were rescued by the brig Albatross (Norway). Eumenides was on a voyage from Beaufort, South Carolina, United States to Greenock, Renfrewshire.
Great Western	United States	The ship ran aground in the River Mersey off Eastham, Cheshire, United Kingdom. She was on a voyage from San Francisco, California to Liverpool, Lancashire, United Kingdom. She was refloated the next day with assistance from the tugs Great Emperor and Liverpool (both United Kingdom) but drove ran aground at Egremont, Lancashire. She was again refloated.
Laurdal	Norway	The barque wrecked at Eierlandse Gat, Texel, the Netherlands. All 14 crew members were rescued.
Mathilde Ann	United Kingdom	The cutter was wrecked at Yarmouth, Isle of Wight.
M. D. Sarah	United Kingdom	The schooner foundered 3 nautical miles (5.6 km) off Cayeux-sur-Mer, Somme, France with the loss of all hands. She was on a voyage from Par, Cornwall to Abbeville, Somme.
Old Goody	United Kingdom	The schooner was driven ashore at the Cliff End Fort, Isle of Wight. She was on a voyage from Caen, Calvados, France to Guernsey, Channel Islands.
Paragon	United Kingdom	The ship was abandoned in the North Sea off Great Yarmouth, Norfolk. Her five crew were rescued by Bessemer (United Kingdom). Paragon was on a voyage from South Shields, County Durham to Trouville-sur-Mer, Calvados.
Prigue	United Kingdom	The brig was driven onto The Shingles, off the Isle of Wight. She was on a voyage from Middlesbrough, Yorkshire to Briton Ferry, Glamorgan.
Princess Alexandra	United Kingdom	The schooner ran aground on the Braganza Bank, at the mouth of the Pará River and sank. Her eleven crew were rescued. She was on a voyage from Greenock, Renfrewshire to Pará, Brazil.
Resolute	United Kingdom	The ship ran aground on the Goodwin Sands. Her crew were rescued by the Ramsgate Lifeboat Bradford ( Royal National Lifeboat Institution). She was on a voyage from Bo'ness, Lothian to Lisbon, Portugal She was a total loss.
Richard White	United Kingdom	The barge capsized in the River Medway with the loss of a crew member.
Rocket	United Kingdom	The schooner ran aground on the Brake Sand. Her crew were rescued. She was refloated and taken in tow for Dover, Kent but was found to be sinking and was beached at St. Margaret's Bay, Kent.
Speculation	United Kingdom	The sloop foundered in the English Channel off Christchurch, Hampshire with the loss of all hands.
Thistle	United Kingdom	The steamship foundered in the English Channel 6 nautical miles (11 km) off Belleville-en-Caux, Seine-Inférieure, France with the loss of all twelve crew. She was on a voyage from Newcastle upon Tyne, Northumberland to Dieppe, Seine-Inférieure.
Thomas and James	United Kingdom	The ship sank in the Bristol Channel off Bridgwater, Somerset.
Warrior	United Kingdom	The barge was driven ashore at Portsmouth, Hampshire. She was refloated the next day.
William Pitt	United Kingdom	The ketch became waterlogged and was run ashore near Bournemouth, Hampshire. Her two crew were rescued; one by the Swanage RNLI lifeboat Charlotte Mary (ON 193), and one by lifebuoy.
Unnamed	France	The smack foundered in the English Channel 1.5 nautical miles (2.8 km) west south west of Christchurch, Hampshire with the loss of all four crew.
Unnamed	United Kingdom	The barge was driven in to London Bridge and sank in the River Thames. All on board survived.
Unnamed	United Kingdom	The brigantine foundered in the English Channel 8 nautical miles (15 km) off Portland Bill, Dorset.

== 13 March ==
List of shipwrecks: 13 March 1876
Ship	State	Description
Active	United Kingdom	The steamship ran aground at Lowestoft, Suffolk. She was reported to be on a voyage from Newcastle upon Tyne, Northumberland to Aberdeen.
Alaca	United Kingdom	The Thames barge sprang a leak and sank on the Maplin Sand, in the North Sea off the coast of Essex.
Avon	United Kingdom	The steamship ran aground at Chester, Cheshire. She was on a voyage from Liverpool, Lancashire to Dublin.
Catherine	United Kingdom	The barque was driven ashore at Ellewoutsdijk, Zeeland, Netherlands. She was on a voyage from Antwerp, Belgium to Baltimore, Maryland, United States.
Douze Apotres	France	The ship was driven ashore at the Rammekens Castle, Vlissingen, Zeeland. She was on a voyage from Antwerp to "Acilles".
Emma L. Oulton	United Kingdom	The barque was abandoned in the Atlantic Ocean. Her crew were rescued by Ebenezer (United States). Emma L. Oulton was on a voyage from Baltimore to Queenstown, County Cork.
France	United Kingdom	The barque was in collision with the brig Eliza B (United Kingdom) in the Bristol Channel off Oxwich, Glamorgan and sank with the loss of a crew member. Survivors were rescued by Eliza B.
Hirondelle	France	The brig was driven ashore at the Rammekens Castle. She was on a voyage from Antwerp to Africa.
Jeune St. Pierre	France	The ship was driven ashore at the Rammekens Castle. She was on a voyage from Antwerp to Cherbourg, Manche.
Maria	Russia	The ship was driven ashore at the Rammekens Castle. She was on a voyage from Leuven, Flemish Brabant, Belgium to Newcastle upon Tyne.
Saint Pierre	France	The ship ran aground and was wrecked on the Blackshaw Bank, off the coast of Wigtownshire, United Kingdom.
Susan Douglas	United Kingdom	The brig was wrecked on the west point of "Samma Samma Island", China with the loss of a crew member. She was on a voyage from Hong Kong to Ningbo.
William Wilson	United Kingdom	The ship ran aground on the Kaloot Bank, in the North Sea off the coast of Zeeland. She was on a voyage from Antwerp to Cardiff, Glamorgan.
Unnamed	Netherlands	The dredger was run down and sunk off Hoek van Holland by the steamship Ironopolis (United Kingdom).

== 14 March ==
List of shipwrecks: 14 March 1876
Ship	State	Description
Abbie Thomas	Canada	The ship was driven ashore at La Tremblade, Charente-Inférieure, France. She was on a voyage from Philadelphia, Pennsylvania, United States to Dunkirk, Nord, France.
Anne	Germany	The ship ran aground on the Randzel, off Borkum.
Elizabeth Kelly	United Kingdom	The brigantine sank at Newport, Monmouthshire. She was raised the next day.
France	France	The barque was run into by Eliza B. and sank in the Bristol Channel off the coast of Glamorgan United Kingdom with the loss of a crew member.
Grecian Daughter	United Kingdom	The schooner was abandoned in the North Sea. Her five crew were rescued by the steamship Leo (United Kingdom).
John and Mary	United Kingdom	The schooner was driven ashore near Bangor, County Down. She was on a voyage from Belfast, County Antrim to an English port.
Juliet	United Kingdom	The ship was wrecked at Caen, Calvados, France. Her crew were rescued. She was on a voyage from Llanelly, Glamorgan to Caen.
Madeline	United Kingdom	The schooner was driven ashore near Kingsdown, Kent. She was on a voyage from Great Yarmouth, Norfolk to Belfast. She was refloated and towed in to Ramsgate, Kent.
Maria Mercede	Italy	The ship foundered off the Capo Caccia Lighthouse, Sardinia. She was on a voyage from Porto Conte, Sardinia to Antwerp, Belgium.
Martha	France	The fishing schooner capsized off the coast of Iceland with the loss of two of her seventeen crew. Survivors were rescued by the fishing schooner Ceres and another vessel (both France).
Queen of the East	United Kingdom	The ship ran aground on the Diamond Reef. She was on a voyage from New York, United States to Liverpool, Lancashire. She was refloated and resumed her voyage.
Queen of the Isles	United Kingdom	The schooner was driven ashore at Aberlady, Lothian. She was on a voyage from Scalloway, Shetland Islands to Leith, Lothian.
Victoria	United Kingdom	The schooner was driven ashore and severely damaged at Lynmouth, Devon. Her crew were rescued.
Unnamed	Flag unknown	The schooner was driven ashore near Holywood, County Down.
Unnamed	Flag unknown	The ship was wrecked in Bootle Bay with the loss of two lives.
Seven unnamed vessels	United Kingdom	The barges sank in the River Thames at Blackwall, Middlesex, and Plaistow, Essex.

== 15 March ==
List of shipwrecks: 15 March 1876
Ship	State	Description
Angelita	Spain	The schooner collided with the steamship Coomassie (France) and foundered in the Atlantic Ocean 40 nautical miles (74 km) off Cape Trafalgar with the loss of two of her eight crew. Survivors were rescued by Coomassie. Angelita was on a voyage from Torrevieja to Santiago.
Bebside	United Kingdom	The steamship was driven ashore and wrecked at Staithes, Yorkshire. Her eighteen crew were rescued by the Whitby Lifeboat Hannah Somerset ( Royal National Lifeboat Institution). Bebside was on a voyage from Newcastle upon Tyne, Northumberland to London.
Dunaberg	Flag unknown	The ship was driven ashore at Brindisi, Italy. She was on a voyage from Trieste to Bahia, Brazil. She was refloated.
Fassfern	United Kingdom	The brig was driven ashore and severely damaged at Villaricos, Spain. Her crew were rescued.
Frederick or Frederica Pattenborg Zetland	Germany	The ship, a brig or a schooner, was driven ashore and wrecked between Audresselles and Cap Gris Nez, Pas-de-Calais, France with the loss of three of the five people on board. She was on a voyage from Hamburg to Rosario, Argentina.
Friendship	United Kingdom	The ketch was driven ashore at Langstone, Hampshire.
Gehr	Norway	The brig ran aground on the Kentish Knock. She was on a voyage from Kragerø to Smyrna, Ottoman Empire. She was refloated and taken in to The Downs.
George Anson	United Kingdom	The brigantine ran aground on the Longsand, in the North Sea off the coast of Essex and sank. Her crew were rescued. She was on a voyage from Newcastle upon Tyne, Northumberland to Folkestone, Kent.
Great Western	United States	The ship was driven ashore at Eastham, Cheshire, United Kingdom. She was on a voyage from San Francisco, California to Liverpool, Lancashire, United Kingdom. She was refloated but came ashore near Egremont, Lancashire.
König Wilhelm	Netherlands	The steamship ran aground, capsized was and wrecked at Hoek van Holland, South Holland. Her crew were rescued.
Lambton	United Kingdom	The steamship ran aground near Honfleur, Manche, France. She was on a voyage from Sunderland, County Durham to Rouen, Seine-Inférieure, France. She was refloated on 25 March and resumed her voyage.
Mercur	Germany	The steamship was driven ashore at Hoek van Holland. She was on a voyage from Liepāja, Russia to Rotterdam, South Holland.
Parisien	United Kingdom	The ship was driven ashore at Garrucha, Spain and was abandoned by her fifteen crew. She was on a voyage from South Shields, County Durham to Garrucha. She became a wreck.
4	United Kingdom	The lighter struck rocks off Seaham, County Durham and sank. She was being towed from South Shields to Middlesbrough, Yorkshire.
Unnamed	United Kingdom	The lighter was driven ashore and wrecked at Seaham. She was being towed from South Shields to Middlesbrough.

== 16 March ==
List of shipwrecks: 16 March 1876
Ship	State	Description
Bellona	United Kingdom	The smack was driven ashore at Queenstown, County Cork. She was on a voyage from Queenstown to Galway.
Beulah	United Kingdom	The schooner was abandoned on the Dogger Bank. Her crew were rescued by the fishing smack Rippling Wave (United Kingdom). Beulah was on a voyage from London to East Hartlepool, County Durham.
Florence	New Zealand	The 55-ton schooner was en route from Dunedin to Wellington in ballast when she was hit by a strong gale off Banks Peninsula and foundered. One crewman drowned; the rest successfully reached Lyttelton in the ship's boat.
Hoopoe, and Kong Sverre	United Kingdom; Norway	The steamships collided in the River Mersey off New Brighton, Cheshire and were both severely damaged. Hoopoe was on a voyage from Antwerp, Belgium to Liverpool. Kong Sverre was on a voyage from Christiania to Liverpool.
Kathleen	United Kingdom	The ship ran aground on the Trinity Sand, in the North Sea off the coast of Lincolnshire. She was on a voyage from London to South Shields, County Durham. She was refloated and assisted in to Grimsby, Lincolnshire.
Moreton	United Kingdom	The steamship ran aground at Hayle, Cornwall. Her crew were rescued.

== 17 March ==
List of shipwrecks: 17 March 1876
Ship	State	Description
Athlete, and King Richard	United Kingdom	The steamship King Richard was run into by the steamship Athlete.in the River Mersey. She was towed to Tranmere, Cheshire, where she sank. Athlete was severely damaged.
Christian Martha	Netherlands	The galiot collided with a schooner and sank in the North Sea. Her crew were rescued by fishing smacks.
Fortuna	Germany	The ship was driven ashore near Scholpin with the loss of six of the fifteen people on board. She was on a voyage from Swinemünde to Pillau.
Hoopoe, and Kong Sverre	United Kingdom; Norway	The steamship Hoopoe collided with Kong Sverre in the River Mersey. Both vessels were severely damaged.
Laurel	United Kingdom	The schooner was driven ashore on Scalpay, Outer Hebrides. Her crew survived. She was on a voyage from Newcastle upon Tyne, Northumberland to Kingstown, County Dublin.

== 18 March ==
List of shipwrecks: 18 March 1876
Ship	State	Description
Arethusa	United Kingdom	The schooner ran aground and was wrecked at Caernarfon. She was on a voyage from Caernarfon to London.
Garibaldi	United Kingdom	The sloop was driven ashore 10 nautical miles (19 km) north of Aberdeen. Her crew were rescued.
Isabel	France	The steamship was driven ashore and wrecked west of St. Ives, Cornwall, United Kingdom with the loss of all 30 crew. She was on a voyage from La Rochelle, Charente-Inférieure, France to Bristol, Gloucestershire.
John	United Kingdom	The schooner was wrecked on the Barrow Sand, in the Thames Estuary. Her crew were rescued by the tug Oscar (United Kingdom).
Lizzy Marton	United Kingdom	The schooner was abandoned of Teignmouth, Devon. Her five crew were rescued by the Teignmouth Lifeboat.
Lori	United Kingdom	The ship was driven ashore at the Delaware Breakwater. She was refloated.
Magdala	United Kingdom	The barque was wrecked in the Chandeleur Islands with the loss of four of her crew. She was on a voyage from Liverpool, Lancashire to New Orleans, Louisiana, and/or Pascagoula, Mississippi, United States.
Star of Brunswick	United Kingdom	The schooner foundered in the Bristol Channel off Lynmouth, Devon. Her crew were rescued. She was on a voyage from Cardiff, Glamorgan to Ilfracombe, Devon.
Thor	Sweden	The ship ran aground on the English Bank, in the River Plate and was wrecked. She was on a voyage from Rio de Janeiro, Brazil to Stockholm.
Trevithick	United Kingdom	The steamship ran aground at Maassluis, South Holland, Netherlands.

== 19 March ==
List of shipwrecks: 19 March 1876
Ship	State	Description
Abel, and Hesse-Darmstadt	United Kingdom; Germany	The ships collided in the River Mersey. Both vessels were severely damaged.
August Mayor	United Kingdom	The barque was driven ashore 4 nautical miles (7.4 km) east of Gravelines, Nord. Her crew were rescued. She was on a voyage from Dunkirk, Nord to London.
Cairngorm	United Kingdom	The ship was driven ashore at Cambois, Northumberland. She was on a voyage from the Cromarty Firth to Sunderland, County Durham. She was refloated on 23 March and towed in to Blyth, Northumberland.
Dauntless	United Kingdom	The ship was driven ashore at Exmouth, Devon. She was on a voyage from South Shields, County Durham to Exeter, Devon. She was refloated.
Jane Roberts	United Kingdom	The ship collided with a barge and sank in the River Mersey.
Kate Ellen	United Kingdom	The Mersey Flat sank in the River Mersey off Woodside, Cheshire.

== 20 March ==
List of shipwrecks: 20 March 1876
Ship	State	Description
Aspatria	United Kingdom	The ship was driven ashore at "Ferdinando Niargioja", Sicily, Italy. Her crew were rescued.
Britannia	United Kingdom	The smack sprang a leak and sank off "Drunmore". She was on a voyage from Belfast, County Antrim to Stranraer, Wigtownshire.
County of Ayr	United Kingdom	The ship was wrecked on the Arklow Bank, in the Irish Sea off the coast of County Wicklow. All but her captain were taken off. She was on a voyage from Glasgow, Renfrewshire to Demerara, British Guiana and/or Batavia, Netherlands East Indies. County of Ayr was refloated on 22 March and towed in to Waterford.
Deux Reines	France	The lugger struck the pier and sank at Dunkirk, Nord. She was on a voyage from Dunkirk to Bordeaux, Gironde.
Fair Maid	United Kingdom	The schooner sprang a leak and foundered in the North Sea off Hartlepool, County Durham. Her crew were rescued by the steamship Temon (United Kingdom).
Frans	Germany	The ship ran aground and was wrecked at Opobo, Africa.
Jane Roberts	United Kingdom	The Mersey Flat collided with the Mersey Flat Jackal (United Kingdom) and sank on the Devil's Bank, in Liverpool Bay.
Kate	United Kingdom	The schooner was driven ashore at Crosby, Lancashire.
Killin	United Kingdom	The schooner ran aground on the Barber Sand, in the North Sea off the coast of Norfolk and was wrecked. Her five crew were rescued by the Caister Lifeboat. She was on a voyage from Thurso, Caithness to Great Yarmouth, Norfolk.
Maggie M. Weaver	United States	The schooner went ashore near Sandy Hook, New Jersey and broke up in a severe gale with the loss of all six crew.
Veritas	United Kingdom	The schooner was driven ashore at Shrape Point, Isle of Wight. She was on a voyage from Hartlepool, County Durham to Poole, Dorset. She was refloated and taken in to Cowes, Isle of Wight in a severely leaky condition.
Vertrouwen	Netherlands	The ship foundered at sea. Her crew were rescued by the smack Maid Marian (United Kingdom). Vertrouwen was on a voyage from Granton, Lothian, United Kingdom to Bordeaux, Gironde, France.
Unnamed	United Kingdom	The brigantine was destroyed by fire in the Atlantic Ocean.

== 21 March ==
List of shipwrecks: 21 March 1876
Ship	State	Description
Banshee	Queensland	The steamship was wrecked in a hurricane 15 nautical miles (28 km) from Cardwell with the loss of nineteen lives.
Bryn-y-mor	United Kingdom	The brig was driven ashore and wrecked at Addah, Africa.
Favourite	United Kingdom	The ship ran aground on Mugglin's Rock and was wrecked. Her crew were rescued. She was on a voyage from Wexford to Dublin.
Hattie Eaton	United States	The brig was wrecked near Kittery, Maine with the loss of seven of her eight crew. She was on a voyage from Cienfuegos, Cuba to Boston, Massachusetts.
Juanita	United States	The steamship ran aground in the Savannah River downstream of Pig Island. She was on a voyage from Philadelphia, Pennsylvania to Savannah, Georgia.
Madagascar	United Kingdom	The steamship ran aground at "Brittoback", French Indo-China. She was on a voyage from Bangkok, Siam to Hong Kong. She was refloated and found to be leaky.
Mary Ann	United Kingdom	The ship founderef off Padstow, Cornwall. Her crew were rescued.
Miss Thomas	United Kingdom	The schooner ran aground on the Jangfernbank. She was on a voyage from Portmadoc to Bremen, Germany.
Victor	United Kingdom	The schooner was driven ashore and caught fire at Sandgate, Kent. The fire was extinguished; she was refloated and taken in to Dover, Kent.

== 22 March ==
List of shipwrecks: 22 March 1876
Ship	State	Description
Broughty Castle	United Kingdom	The schooner was run into by the steamship Thistle (United Kingdom) and sank in Lough Foyle. Her crew were rescued. Broughty Castle was on a voyage from Londonderry to Morecambe, Lancashire.
Elodie	Austria-Hungary	The barque foundered in the Atlantic Ocean 6 nautical miles (11 km) north east of Trevose Head, Cornwall, United Kingdom. Her eleven crew survived. She was on a voyage from Cardiff, Glamorgan, United Kingdom to Barcelona, Spain.
Majestic	United Kingdom	The schooner was driven ashore on Dulas Island, Anglesey, United Kingdom. Her crew were rescued. She was on a voyage from Liverpool, Lancashire to Wicklow.

== 23 March ==
List of shipwrecks: 23 March 1876
Ship	State	Description
Pasqualina	Austria-Hungary	The brig foundered in the Bay of Biscay with the loss of all hands. She had been in collision with the schooner Ferdinand (United Kingdom on or about 20 March. Pasqualina was on a voyage from Mostaganem, Morocco to Antwerp, Belgium.

== 24 March ==
List of shipwrecks: 24 March 1876
Ship	State	Description
Hope	United Kingdom	The smack sprang a leak and foundered off Lossiemouth, Moray. Her crew were rescued by the schooner Baynes (United Kingdom). Hope was on a voyage from Macduff, Aberdeenshire to the Outer Hebrides.
Margaret Anne	United Kingdom	The ship was sighted whilst on a voyage from Larache, Morocco to a British port. No further trace, presumed foundered with the loss of all hands.

== 25 March ==
List of shipwrecks: 25 March 1876
Ship	State	Description
Asa Porter	Canada	The brig was wrecked near Portsmouth, New Hampshire, United States with the loss of eight of her nine crew.
Flower of Enzie	United Kingdom	The ship was driven ashore at Rattray Head, Aberdeenshire. Her crew were rescued. She was on a voyage from Newcastle upon Tyne, Northumberland to Lossiemouth, Moray.
George Canning	United Kingdom	The barque ran aground in St. Nicholas Gat. She was on a voyage from South Shields, County Durham to Rio de Janeiro, Brazil. She was refloated and put in to Portsmouth, Hampshire.
Great Western	United Kingdom	The steamship collided with a barque off Long Island, New York. She was beached on Fire Island and broke in two. Her crew were rescued. She was on a voyage from Palermo, Sicily, Italy to New York City, United States.
Hope	United Kingdom	The smack sprang a leak and foundered in the Moray Firth. Her crew were rescued by Bozic (United Kingdom).
Jane Bacon	United Kingdom	The steamship ran aground on the Cross Sand, in the North Sea off the coast of Norfolk. She was refloated and resumed her voyage.
Mary	United Kingdom	The barque collided with the steamship Newton (United Kingdom) and was abandoned off Holyhead, Anglesey. Mary was on a voyage from Liverpool, Lancashire to Nova Scotia, Canada. She was towed in to Holyhead in a waterlogged condition by the steamship Star of England (United Kingdom)).
Planter	United States	The steamship was wrecked on the Cape Romain Shoals, off the coast of South Carolina whilst assisting a vessel that had been driven ashore.
Retreiver	Belgium	The barque ran aground east of Gravelines, Nord, France. She was on a voyage from Newcastle upon Tyne, Northumberland, United Kingdom to a Spanish port. She broke in two and was a total loss.
Unnamed	United Kingdom	The brig was destroyed by fire in the Atlantic Ocean.
Unnamed	Sweden	The ship was wrecked on Terschelling, Friesland, Netherlands.

== 26 March ==
List of shipwrecks: 26 March 1876
Ship	State	Description
Annie Mabel	United Kingdom	The ship was wrecked on the Shengsi Islands. Her crew were rescued. She was on a voyage from Newcastle upon Tyne, Northumberland to Shanghai, China.
Ransome	United Kingdom	The steamship ran aground in the River Gipping. She was on a voyage from Newcastle upon Tyne to Ipswich, Suffolk. She was refloated the next day and taken in to Ipswich.

== 27 March ==
List of shipwrecks: 27 March 1876
Ship	State	Description
Anna	Germany	The schooner was driven ashore and wrecked at Anstruther, Fife, United Kingdom. Her five crew were rescued by the Anstruther Lifeboat. She was on a voyage from Rendsburg to Burntisland, Fife.
Eliza	United Kingdom	The ship sprang a leak and put in to Boulogne, Pas-de-Calais, France, where she ran aground. She was on a voyage from Rouen, Seine-Inférieure, France to Whitstable, Kent.
Cierus	Germany	The ship ran aground on "Windingen". She was on a voyage from Memel to Kirkcaldy, Fife. She was refloated with assistance.
John Walker	United Kingdom	The fishing smack foundered off the Faroe Islands with the loss of all fourteen cfrew.
Louise Auguste	Germany	The brig ran aground on "Windingen". She was on a voyage from Memel to Grangemouth, Stirlingshire, United Kingdom. She was refloated with assistance.

== 28 March ==
List of shipwrecks: 28 March 1876
Ship	State	Description
Aline	France	The ship sank off "Houa". Her crew were rescued.
Elvira	Spain	The steamship exploded and sank at Pasaia with the loss of several lives.
Goethe	Germany	The steamship ran aground in the Elbe downstream of Schulau.
Isabella	United Kingdom	The smack ran aground on the Nore and was wrecked. Her crew were rescued by the smack Claude (United Kingdom).
Silver Star	United States	The ship was destroyed by fire at Pará, Brazil.
St. Bernard	United Kingdom	The ship departed from Iquique, Chile for Falmouth, Cornwall. No further trace, presumed foundered with the loss of all fifteen crew.

== 29 March ==
List of shipwrecks: 29 March 1876
Ship	State	Description
Ella	United States	The barque was driven ashore and wrecked near Anaheim, California.

== 30 March ==
List of shipwrecks: 30 March 1876
Ship	State	Description
Brilliant	United Kingdom	The ship was wrecked at Caminha, Portugal. Her crew were rescued. She was on a voyage from Havre de Grâce, Seine-Inférieure, France to the Rio de la Hacha.
Brilliant	United Kingdom	The barque was wrecked on Skagen, Denmark. Her crew were rescued. She was on a voyage from Stettin, Germany to London.
Ellen Beatrice	United Kingdom	The schooner ran aground at Newport, Monmouthshire. She was on a voyage from an Irish port to Newport.
Harriet	United Kingdom	The brig was run into by the steamship J. B. Eminson (United Kingdom) and sank at Sunderland, County Durham. Her crew were rescued by cobles. Harriet was on a voyage from Sunderland to Littlehampton, Sussex.
Prospero	United Kingdom	The ship departed from Rangoon, Burma for Liverpool, Lancashire. No further trace, presumed foundered with the loss of all 36 crew.
Witch of the Wave	United Kingdom	The ship was wrecked at Opobo, Lagos Colony. She was on a voyage from Liverpool to Africa.

== 31 March ==
List of shipwrecks: 31 March 1876
Ship	State	Description
Avanti	Sweden	The steamship was driven ashore on "Winga". She was refloated in mid-April and taken in to Gothenburg for repairs.
Pollux	Norway	The brig ran aground at Trelleborg. Sweden. She was on a voyage from Sandefjord to Danzig, Germany. She was refloated with the assistance of a steamship and taken in to Copenhagen, Denmark in a leaky condition.
Renska	United Kingdom	The ship was wrecked in the Farne Islands, Northumberland. Her crew survived. She was on a voyage from "Ituhoe" to Grangemouth, Stirlingshire.
Sovereign	United Kingdom	The barque heeled over at Sunderland, County Durham. She was prevented from capsizing by the barque Alice Mary (United Kingdom) which was alongside.

== Unknown date ==
List of shipwrecks: Unknown date in March 1876
Ship	State	Description
Alice Ablett	United Kingdom	The brigantine was abandoned at sea. Her crew were rescued. She was on a voyage from Jamaica to Saint Thomas, Virgin Islands and Queenstown, County Cork.
Alice Otto	Belgium	The steamship ran aground on the Cane Rocks between 19 and 24 March. She was on a voyage from Malta to Antwerp. She was refloated and put back to Malta in a leaky condition.
Annie Putnam	United Kingdom	The barque foundered before 16 March. Her crew were rescued. She was on a voyage from the Bull River to London.
Athenais	United Kingdom	The ship ran aground on the Rebecca Shoal. She was on a voyage from Pensacola, Florida, United States to Liverpool, Lancashire.
Belle	United Kingdom	The ship was sunk by ice off Baccalieu Island, Newfoundland Colony. She was on a voyage from the Newfoundland Colony to a European port.
Brother's Pride	United Kingdom	The ship was driven ashore on the coast of Brazil. She was on a voyage from Arbroath, Forfarshire to the Rio Grande. She was refloated and takne in to Pernambuco, where she was condemned.
Ceres	United States	The ship was abandoned in the Atlantic Ocean before 27 March. She was on a voyage from Cárdenas, Cuba to New York.
China	United Kingdom	The full-rigged ship was destroyed by fire in the Indian Ocean. Her crew were rescued. She was on a voyage from Calcutta, India to Leith, Lothian.
City of Galveston	United States	The steamship was wrecked in the Bahamas.
Consett	United Kingdom	The steamship ran aground in the Red Sea. She was on a voyage from Newcastle upon Tyne, Northumberland to Bombay, India. She was refloated and resumed her voyage, arriving at Bombay on 22 March.
Corsair	United Kingdom	The steamship collided with the steamship Solent (United Kingdom) and foundered in the Bristol Channel off Lundy Island, Devon with the loss of four of her crew. Survivors were rescued by Solent. Corsair was on a voyage from Newport, Monmouthshire to the Charente.
Crescent	United Kingdom	The ship sank in the Dogger Bank. Her crew were rescued by the smack Nyanza (United Kingdom). Crescent was on a voyage from Middlesbrough, Yorkshire to Helsingborg, Sweden.
D. Talbot	United Kingdom	The ship was abandoned in the Atlantic Ocean before 27 March. She was on a voyage from Sagua la Grande, Cuba to Boston, Massachusetts.
Esmeralda	United Kingdom	The sloop collided with the brigantine Julia (United Kingdom) off Plymouth, Devon and was abandoned. Her crew were rescued by the pilot boat Daniel (United Kingdom). Esmeralda was subsequently taken in to Plymouth.
Frank Clark	United States	The ship collided with another vessel and foundered at sea. She was on a voyage from Saint John's, Newfoundland Colony to New York.
Great Britain	United Kingdom	The ship sprang a leak and was abandoned at sea. Twenty-four of her crew took to a boat; only ten were still alive when rescued six days later by Greta (United Kingdom). Great Britain was on a voyage from Virginia, United States to a British port. She was subsequently discovered by Mallowdale (United Kingdom). Two bodies were discovered on board and were buried at sea.
Isabella	United Kingdom	The smack was wrecked on the Nore. Her crew were rescued.
Jacob V. Troop	Canada	The ship was abandoned in the Atlantic Ocean. Her crew were rescued. She was on a voyage from New York to Bristol, Gloucestershire, United Kingdom.
Jedanesti Dubrovacki	Flag unknown	The ship was driven ashore in Chesapeake Bay. She was on a voyage from Baltimore, Maryland, United States to Queenstown. She was refloated and put back to Baltimore.
Jeuna	Flag unknown	The ship was driven ashore at "Point Hudson". She was on a voyage from "Tacorna" to "Salavera" and Chimbote, Chile.
Kenedy	United Kingdom	The ship foundered in the Atlantic Ocean before 4 March. All on board were rescued. She was on a voyage from the Rio Grande do Sul to London.
Laurdal	Norway	The ship was wrecked. She was on a voyage from Drammen to Lemvig.
Live Oak	United Kingdom	The barque was abandoned in the Atlantic Ocean. She was subsequently towed in to Shag Harbour, Nova Scotia, Canada in a waterlogged condition.
Majestic	United Kingdom	The ship was severely damaged by fire at New Orleans, Louisiana, United States before 13 March.
Maria Felicite	France	The barque collided with the steamship Orenoque (France) and sank. Maria Felicite was on a voyage from Saigon, French Indochina to Montevideo, Uruguay.
M. B. Nickerson	United States	The ship was wrecked on Bermuda. She was on a voyage from Halifax, Nova Scotia, Canada to Jamaica.
Ocean	Norway	The full-rigged ship was abandoned in the Atlantic Ocean before 8 March. She was on a voyage from Pensacola, Florida, United States to Sharpness, GloucestershireUnited Kingdom.
Prince Arthur	United Kingdom	The ship was lost in Chilean waters on or before 22 March. Her crew were rescued. She was on a voyage from Liverpool to Caldera, Chile.
Rosa Bonheur	United States	The ship ran aground at Pensacola, Florida. She was on a voyage from Pensacola to Liverpool.
Samaritan	United Kingdom	The ship was run into by William Gowland (United Kingdom) and sank off the East Swin Lightship ( Trinity House). Her crew survived. She was on a voyage from Berwick upon Tweed, Northumberland to London.
Sarah Grace	(Dominion of Newfoundland) Newfoundland Colony	The sealer collided with an iceberg and sank off "Rinews".
