= Gabriel Barcia-Colombo =

American film director

- Born: Los Angeles, California
- Education: USC School of Cinematic Arts
- Occupations: Filmmaker; Video artist
- Years active: 2006–present
- Known for: DNA Vending Machine, New York Minute, Hereafter Institute, Platform, Neon Museum Residency
- Relatives: José Rubia Barcia (grandfather)
- Website: www.gabebc.com

Gabriel Barcia-Colombo (born 1982) is an American video artist and filmmaker. His video sculpture installations explore themes of memory, identity, and human connection through a combination of video, photography, and video sculpture.

Barcia-Colombo is the grandson of Spanish poet and writer José Rubia Barcia.

== Early life and career ==
Barcia-Colombo graduated from the USC School of Cinema-Television. He is a professor of Media Arts at the Tisch School of the Arts. In 2008, he was awarded the NYFA grant for video. In 2012, he was made a TED fellow. Barcia-Colombo has presented two TED talks, one in 2012 and another in 2013.

In 2014, Barcia-Colombo founded "Bunker," a pop-up VR gallery in New York City, which features artists' work in the form of code-driven sculpture, augmented reality, and virtual installation. The gallery re-opened at Sotheby's in New York in 2017.

In 2025, Barcia-Colombo directed a music video for David Byrne's single "Everybody Laughs" from the album Who Is the Sky?.

== Art projects ==
=== DNA Vending Machine ===
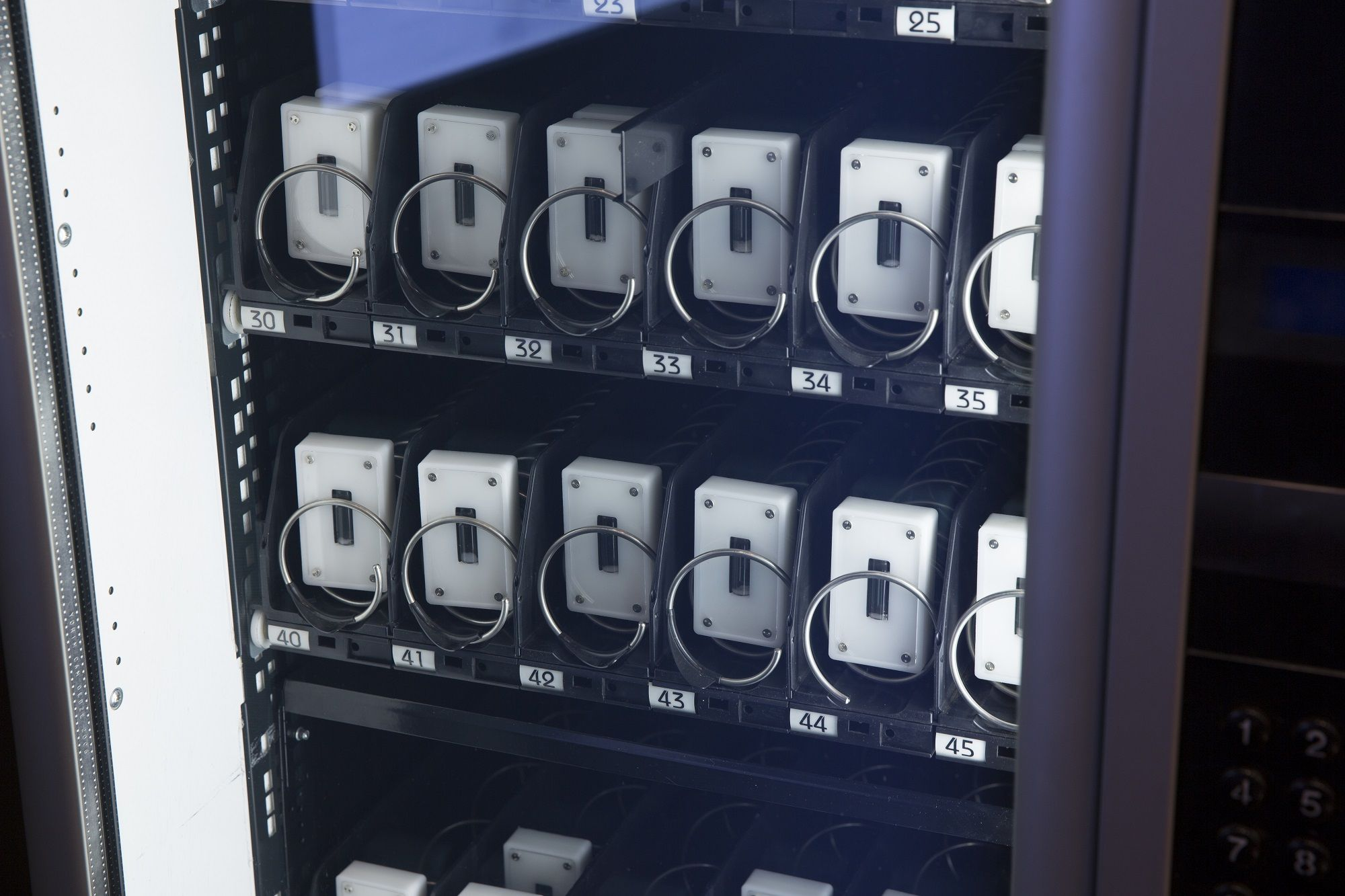
DNA Vending Machine

In 2014, Barcia-Colombo created a vending machine that dispenses human genetic material to raise awareness about privacy issues related to the use of information stored in human DNA. The machine was installed at the Victoria and Albert Museum in London.

=== New York Minute ===
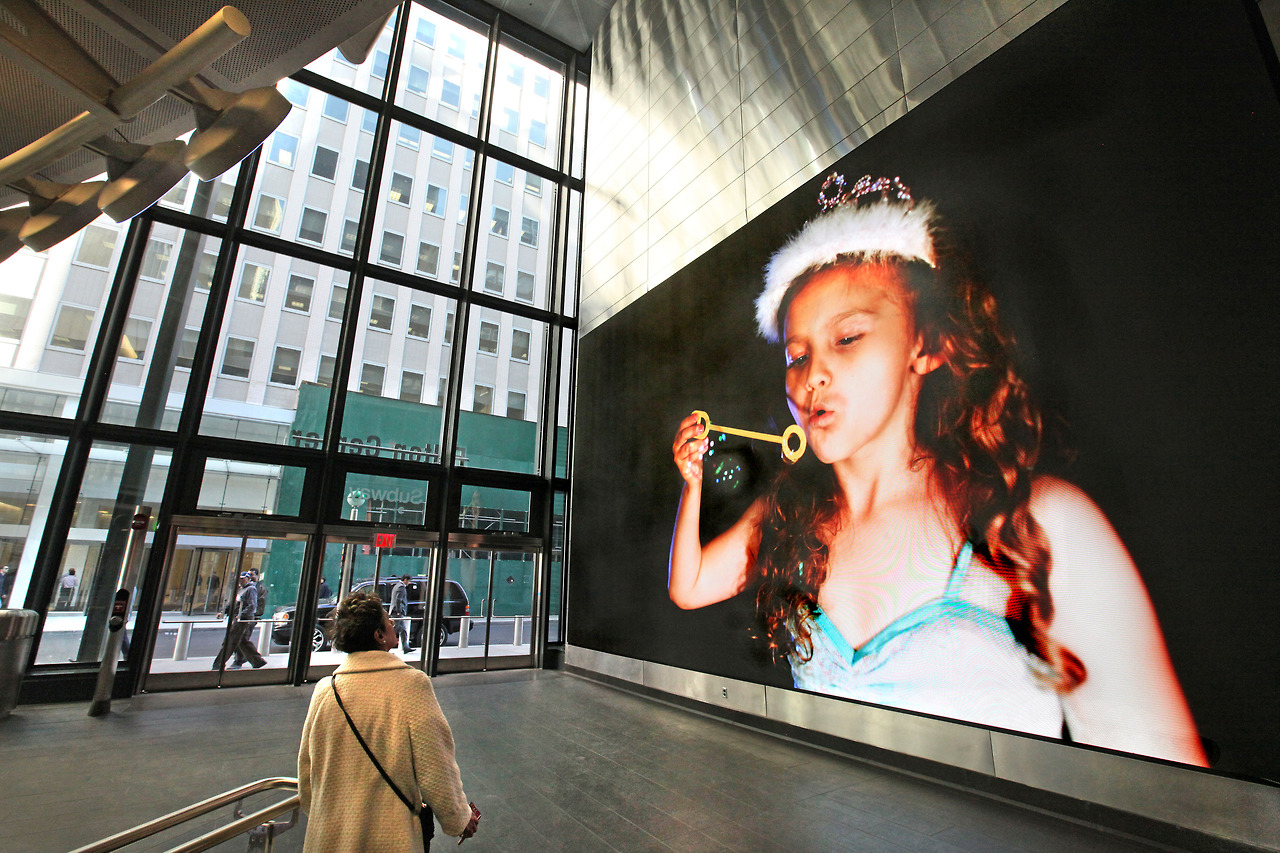
New York Minute

In 2015, Barcia-Colombo created a video art project entitled New York Minute for the Fulton Center. The project featured 52 portraits of New Yorkers performing everyday activities in super-slow motion. The project received recognition from the non-profit organization Americans for the Arts.

=== Hereafter Institute ===
In 2016, Barcia-Colombo created the project Hereafter Institute, which premiered at the Los Angeles County Museum of Art as part of the Art and Technology Lab. The project examines the ways in which people memorialize themselves after death in the digital age and what happens to their data when they die.

=== Platform ===
Platform is a video artwork by Barcia-Colombo that examines what it means to be in a crowd after years spent apart. The work features a portrait of 40 New Yorkers in a slow-motion moment as they come together to examine the passersby in the new Grand Central Terminal. Platform is also shown in the Madison concourse under Grand Central Station.

=== The Neon Museum Residency ===
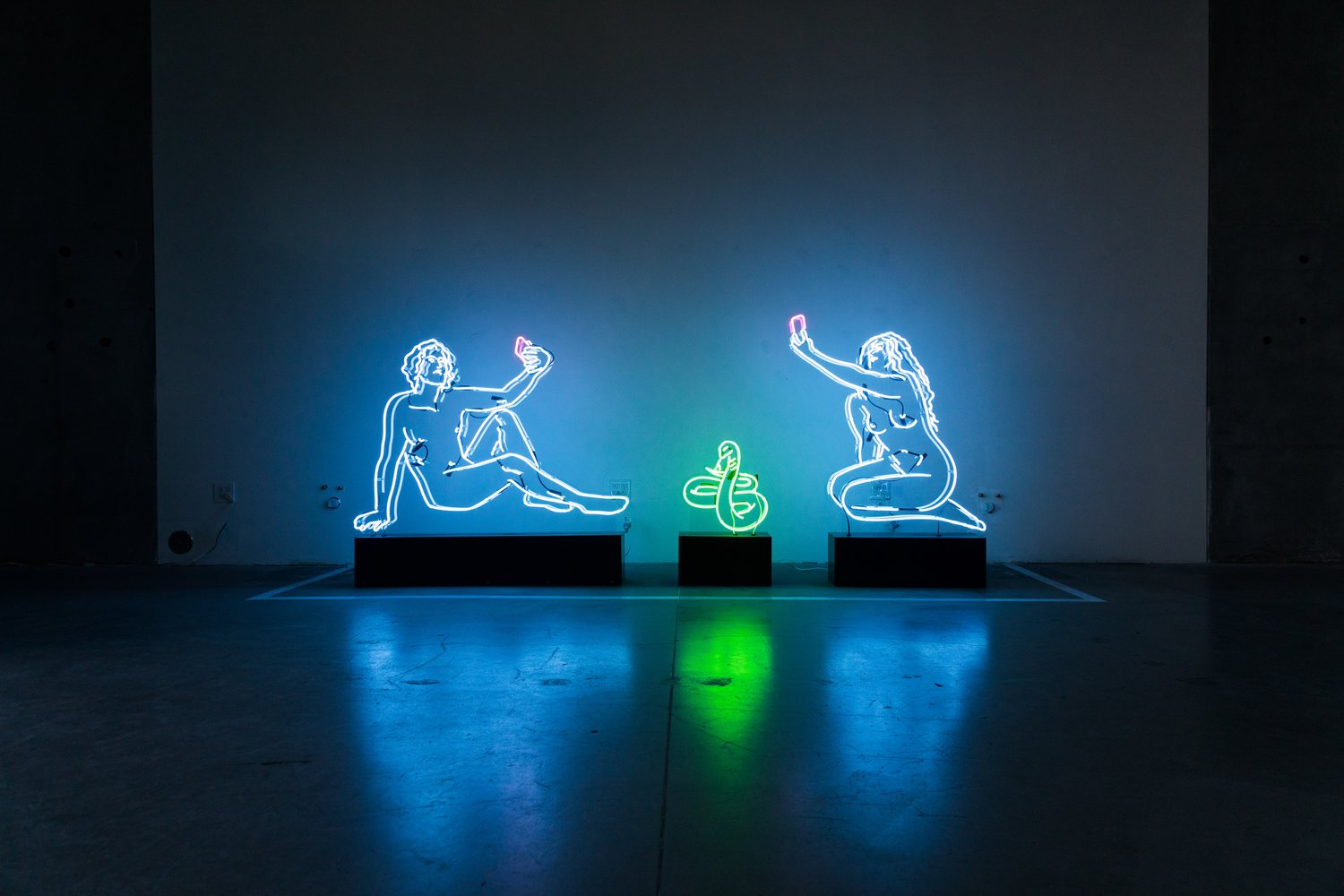
Temptation in Paradise (Pink)

During his residency at The Neon Museum, Barcia-Colombo investigated how technology and light influence memory by creating a series of sculptures inspired by the neon signs at the museum. Barcia-Colombo gave an artist talk via Zoom and conducted a projection mapping workshop with students.

In addition, Barcia-Colombo utilized his studio space at the Juhl to record video of Las Vegas locals. These came together in a composite video sculpture and as recreations of three Las Vegas figures: Vegas Vic performed by Brent Holmes, Vegas Vickie performed by Laci Cerrone, and Elvis performed by Heidi Rider.
