= Valdés, Asturias =

Valdés
- Municipality
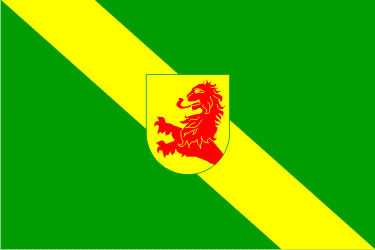
- Flag Coat of arms

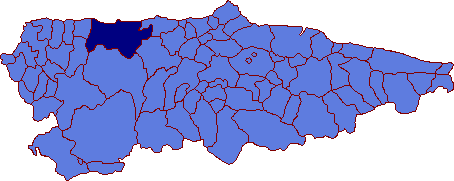

- Location in Spain
- Coordinates: 43°32′38″N 6°32′9″W
- Country: Spain
- Autonomous community: Asturias
- Province: Asturias
- Comarca: Eo-Navia
- Judicial district: Valdés
- Capital: Luarca

Government
  - Alcalde: Simón Guardado Pérez (PSOE)

Area
  - Total: 353.52 km^{2} (136.49 sq mi)
- Highest elevation: 1,010 m (3,310 ft)

Population (2025-01-01)
  - Total: 10,776
  - Density: 30.482/km^{2} (78.948/sq mi)
- Demonym: valdesano/a
- Time zone: UTC+1 (CET)
  - Summer (DST): UTC+2 (CEST)
- Postal code: 33700
- Website: Official website

Valdés is a Spanish municipality in the province of Asturias. Its capital is Luarca. It borders the Bay of Biscay on the north, the municipalities of Navia and Villayón on the west, Tineo on the south, Salas on the southeast, and Cudillero on the east. The rivers Esva, Negro and Barayo flow through the area. The national road N-634 is the main road serving the municipality.

Historical population
Year	Pop.	±%
1991	16,969	—
1996	16,073	−5.3%
2001	14,789	−8.0%
2004	14,395	−2.7%
2007	13,838	−3.9%

The surname "Valdés", widespread throughout Spain and Hispanic America, is believed to have ultimately originated from the town of Valdés.

== Politics ==
	PSOE	PP	CDS	URAS	Others	Total
1979	2	1	11	-	7	21
1983	9	12	-	-	0	21
1987	9	6	1	-	1	17
1991	10	7	0	-	0	17
1995	9	8	-	-	0	17
1999	8	8	-	1	0	17
2003	7	5	-	5	0	17
2007	11	6	-	0	0	17

== Parishes ==
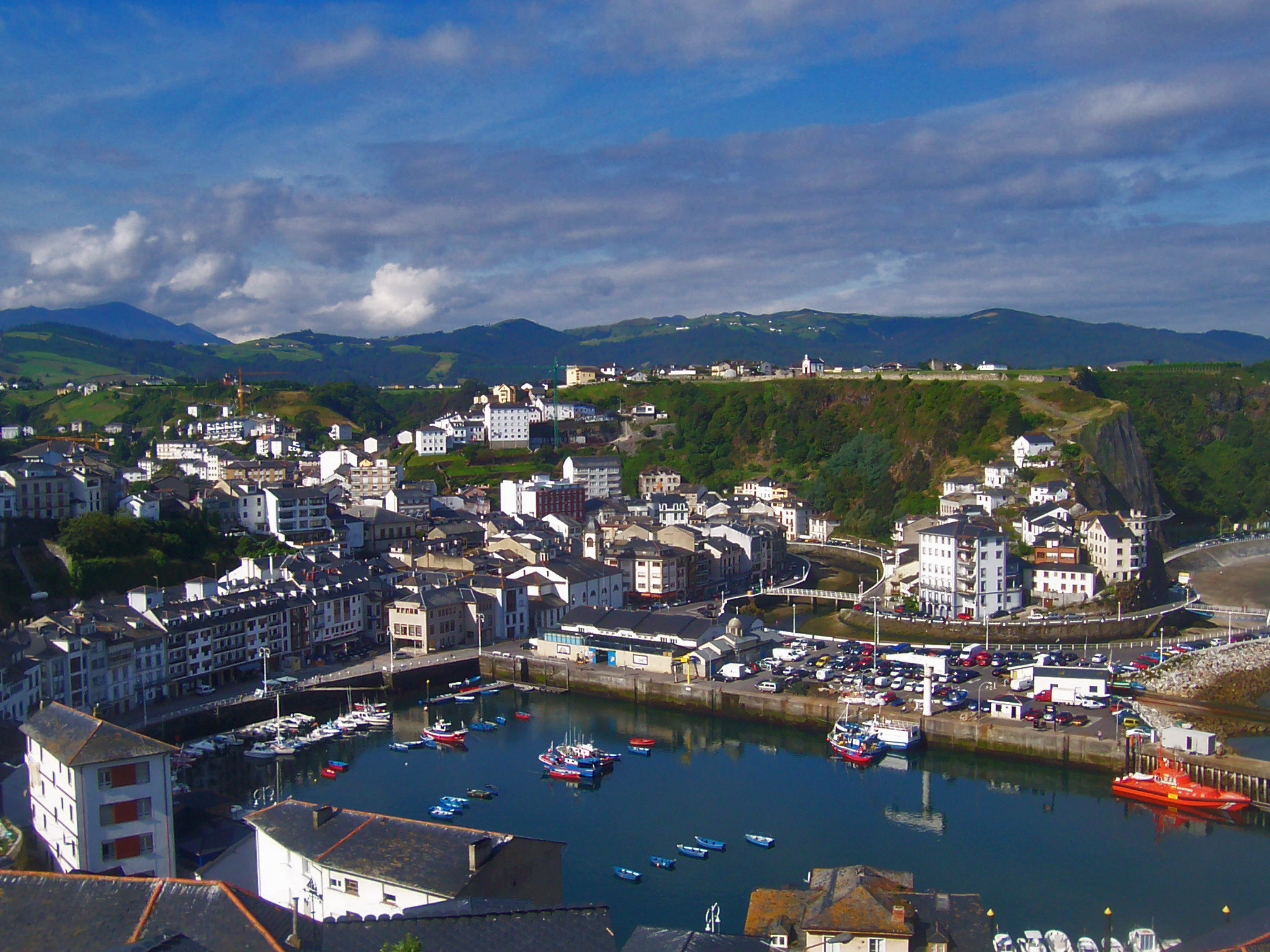
Luarca

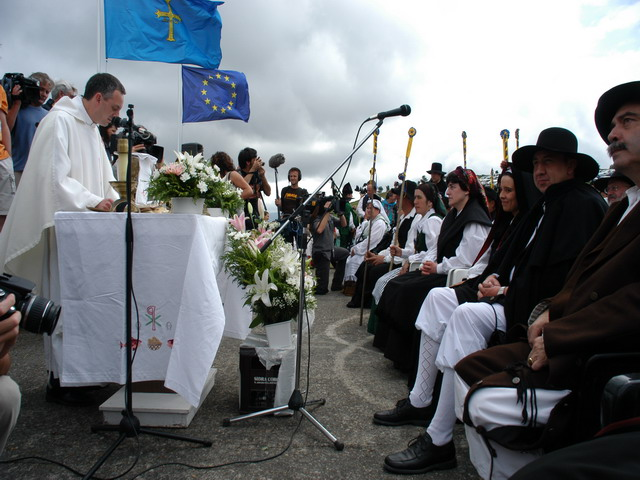
Vaqueira wedding in Aristébano.

- Alienes
- Arcallana
- Ayones
- Barcia
- Cadavedo
- Canero
- Carcedo
- Castañeo
- La Montaña
- Luarca
- Muñás
- Otur
- Paredes
- Santiago
- Trevías

== Notable residents ==
- Álvaro de Albornoz y Liminiana (1879-1954), politician
- María Esther García López (b. 1948), poet and writer
- Severo Ochoa de Albornoz (1905-1993), biochemist and physician, Nobel Prize for Physiology or Medicine in 1959.
- Gil Parrondo y Rico (1921-2016), art director, twice Academy Award winner
- Margarita Salas Folgueras (1938-2019), scientist
- Regina García López (1898-1942), famous artist

== See also ==
- Iglesia de San Miguel Arcángel (Trevías)
- List of municipalities in Asturias
