= Os Verdes Anos =

1963 film by Paulo Rocha

- Directed by: Paulo Rocha
- Written by: Nuno Bragança
- Screenplay by: Nuno Bragança
- Starring: Isabel Ruth; Rui Gomes; Ruy Furtado; Paulo Renato
- Music by: Carlos Paredes
- Release date: November 29, 1963 (Lisbon)
- Running time: 91 minutes
- Country: Portugal
- Language: Portuguese

Os Verdes Anos (The Green Years) is a 1963 Portuguese drama film directed by Paulo Rocha and written by Nuno Bragança. It was Rocha's first feature film. Os Verdes Anos was produced by António da Cunha Telles with a soundtrack by Carlos Paredes.

It stars Rui Gomes as Júlio, a young man who moves to Lisbon to try his luck as a shoemaker, where he develops a jealous love for Ilda who is played by Isabel Ruth, a maid in a wealthy home. Both Júlio and Ilda each represent different environments. Júlio represents the countryside as he has recently moved to the city and Ilda represents the city as she has lived there much longer and is very much used to the urban life, unlike Júlio who struggles deeply. Throughout the film Júlio looks like a "fish out of water" , not adapting well to the city's fast pace and becomes "corrupted" by it. The ending and especially the last shot of the film reflect that sense of not belonging.

It is considered one of the founding films of the Portuguese movement called Novo Cinema (New Cinema). It was released commercially in Portugal on November 29th of 1963.

== Cast ==
- Isabel Ruth
- Rui Gomes
- Ruy Furtado
- Paulo Renato
