= Otur =

Otur may refer to:

- Otur (Valdés), Spain
- Otur, Maharashtra, India
- Otur Sara, Iran
