= River of Gold =

River of Gold may refer to:

- River of Gold (1998 film), a Portuguese drama film
- River of Gold (1971 film), an American TV film
