= Grand Tour (film) =

2024 film by Miguel Gomes

- Theatrical release poster
- Directed by: Miguel Gomes
- Screenplay by: Telmo Churro; Maureen Fazendeiro; Miguel Gomes; Mariana Ricardo
- Produced by: Filipa Reis
- Starring: Gonçalo Waddington; Crista Alfaiate; Cláudio da Silva; Lang Khê Tran; Jorge Andrade; João Pedro Vaz; João Pedro Bénard; Teresa Madruga; Joana Bárcia
- Cinematography: Gui Liang; Sayombhu Mukdeeprom; Rui Poças
- Edited by: Telmo Churro; Pedro Filipe Marques
- Production companies: Uma Pedra no Sapato; Vivo Film; Shellac Sud; Cinéma Defacto
- Distributed by: Uma Pedra no Sapato (Portugal); Lucky Red (Italy); Shellac Films and Tandem (France)
- Release dates: 22 May 2024 (Cannes); 19 September 2024 (Portugal); 27 November 2024 (France)
- Running time: 129 minutes
- Countries: Portugal; Italy; France
- Languages: Portuguese; Burmese; Vietnamese; English
- Box office: $853,766

Grand Tour is a 2024 historical drama film co-written and directed by Miguel Gomes, starring Gonçalo Waddington and Crista Alfaiate. Gomes has stated the movie was inspired by a passage from the W. Somerset Maugham book The Gentleman in the Parlour.

The film had its world premiere at the main competition of the 77th Cannes Film Festival, on 22 May 2024, where Gomes won the Best Director award. In September 2024, it was selected as the Portuguese entry for Best International Feature Film at the 97th Academy Awards, but was not nominated. It was theatrically released in Portugal on 19 September 2024, by Um Pedra no Sapato.

== Plot ==
In 1918, Rangoon is a city under British colonial rule. Civil servant Edward abandons his fiancée Molly on the day they are to be married. He flees in a state of melancholy, contemplating Molly's condition. Determined to be married, Molly follows his trail.

== Cast ==
- Gonçalo Waddington as Edward
- Crista Alfaiate as Molly
- Cláudio da Silva as Timothy Sanders
- Lang Khê Tran as Ngoc
- Jorge Andrade as Reginald
- João Pedro Vaz as Reverendo Carpenter
- João Pedro Bénard as Horace Seagrave
- Teresa Madruga as Espia
- Joana Bárcia as Lady Dragon
- Jani Zhao as Noiva Chinesa
- Manuela Couto as Mrs. Cooper
- Diogo Dória as Major Brown
- Américo Silva as Comandante Britanico
- Giacomo Leone as Signor Farnese

== Production ==
Grand Tour was produced by the Lisbon-based company Uma Pedra No Sapato, in co-production with Italy's Vivo Film and France's Shellac Sud and Cinéma Defacto. In March 2023, Variety reported that the film was shooting in Italy. It also revealed that the film would combine 16 mm film scenes with the images and sounds captured during a research trip to Asia. Gomes sent two cinematographers to capture footage: Guo Liang in China and Sayombhu Mukdeeprom in six other countries. Filming was done with an Arriflex 416 camera using Kodak 7222 film stock. Adobe Premiere Pro was used to edit the film and da Vinci 2K was used for colour correction. While most of the film is in black and white, the film shifts between time periods, blending black-and-white and color footage in the process. Narrative scenes, which remain in black-and-white, were shot on soundstages in Lisbon and Rome. They are interspersed with documentary-style footage of modern-day cities, often in color but also in monochrome.

== Release ==
Grand Tour was selected to compete for the Palme d'Or at the 2024 Cannes Film Festival, where it had its world premiere on 22 May 2024. It was also selected for the main competition of the 71st Sydney Film Festival and was screened on 15 June 2024. It was also selected in Gala Presentation at the 29th Busan International Film Festival to be screened in October 2024. It made its North American premiere at the 2024 Toronto International Film Festival on 5 September 2024, screened in the Main Slate of the 62nd New York Film Festival. It also was selected in the slate of the 69th Valladolid International Film Festival (for its Spanish premiere).

International sales were handled by The Match Factory. Uma Pedra no Sapato theatrically released the film in Portugal on 19 September 2024. The film was originally set to be released theatrically in France by Tandem and Shellac on 18 December 2024, but the release date was pushed forward to 6 November 2024, and then pushed back to 27 November 2024. In June 2024, Mubi acquired distribution rights to the film in North America, United Kingdom, Ireland, Latin America, Germany, Austria, Turkey and India. The film is set to be released in theaters in the US on 28 March 2025.

== Reception ==
=== Critical response ===
On the review aggregator website Rotten Tomatoes, 90% of 62 critics' reviews are positive. The website's consensus reads: "Director Miguel Gomes continues to leverage the possibilities of cinema to explore passion and time in this globetrotting lark, richly realized in striking black-and-white photography." Metacritic, which uses a weighted average, assigned the film a score of 82 out of 100, based on 17 critics, indicating "universal acclaim".

Writing for Variety at Cannes, Jessica Kiang called the film "an enchanting, enlivening, era-spanning, continent-crossing travelogue that runs the very serious risk of infecting you with the antidote: a potent dose of wanderlust-for-life." Jordan Mintzer in The Hollywood Reporter noted that while fans of Gomes' prior work will enjoy the film, "anyone looking for a good story, or characters to get hooked on, may find themselves admiring the scenery without ever relishing it." Peter Bradshaw of The Guardian rated the film four stars and wrote "once again, Portuguese auteur Miguel Gomes delivers a film in which the most complex sophistication coexists with innocence and charm."

=== Accolades ===
Award	Date of ceremony	Category	Recipient(s)	Result	Ref.
Cannes Film Festival	25 May 2024	Palme d'Or	Miguel Gomes	Nominated	
Cannes Film Festival	25 May 2024	Best Director	Miguel Gomes	Won	
Chicago International Film Festival	27 October 2024	Gold Hugo	Grand Tour	Nominated	
Chicago International Film Festival	27 October 2024	Silver Hugo – Best Director	Miguel Gomes	Won	
Chicago International Film Festival	27 October 2024	Silver Hugo – Best Editing	Telmo Churro and Pedro Filipe Marques	Won	
Lumière Awards	20 January 2025	Best International Co-Production	Grand Tour	Nominated	
Platino Awards	27 April 2025	Best Ibero-American Film	Grand Tour	Nominated	
Sur Awards	23 July 2025	Best Ibero-American Film	Grand Tour	Nominated	
Sydney Film Festival	16 June 2024	Best Film	Grand Tour	Nominated	
Valladolid International Film Festival	26 October 2024	Golden Spike	Grand Tour	Nominated	
Valladolid International Film Festival	26 October 2024	'José Salcedo' Award for Best Editing	Telmo Churro, Pedro Filipe Marques	Won	

== See also ==
- List of submissions to the 97th Academy Awards for Best International Feature Film
- List of Portuguese submissions for the Academy Award for Best International Feature Film

== Works cited ==
- Rizov, Vadim (2025). "Escape Routes". Filmmaker. Vol. 33, no. 3. The Gotham Film & Media Institute.
