= Yves Afonso =

French actor (1944–2018)

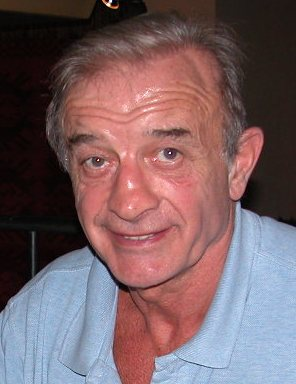
- Afonso in 2004
- Born: 13 February 1944; Saulieu, Côte-d'Or
- Died: 21 January 2018 (aged 73); Paris, France
- Occupation: Actor
- Years active: 1966 – 2018

Yves Afonso (13 February 1944 – 21 January 2018) was a French actor of Portuguese descent. He was born in Saulieu in the Côte-d'Or département. Since his uncredited debut in the movie Masculin, féminin in 1966, he had many roles, both in movies and on television. He normally plays supporting roles, and may have been best known for his role as Inspector Bricard in L'Horloger de Saint-Paul, and the black comedy Week End, where he played Tom Thumb. He died on 21 January 2018 at the age of 73.

== Selected filmography ==
- Masculin Féminin (1966) - L'homme qui se suicide (uncredited)
- Made in U.S.A (1966) - David Goodis
- Week End (1967) - Gros Poucet (uncredited)
- Time to Live (1969) - René
- Une veuve en or (1970) - Un membre de la bande à Raphaël (uncredited)
- Dossier prostitution (1970) - Le placeur (uncredited)
- Cannabis (1970) - (uncredited)
- Vladimir et Rosa (1971) - Yves - un étudiant révolutionnnaire (uncredited)
- La maffia du plaisir (1971) - Un naturiste
- La cavale (1971) - Un gendarme (uncredited)
- Valparaiso, Valparaiso (1971) - Anatole
- L'insolent (1973) - Petit René
- Les volets clos (1973)
- Les gants blancs du diable (1973) - Cartoni, le tueur à gages
- Défense de savoir (1973)
- The Clockmaker (1974) - Insp. Bricard
- Violins at the Ball (1974) - Le cameraman
- The Black Windmill (1974) - Jacques (uncredited)
- France société anonyme (1974) - L'homme de main du fourgueur
- Zig-Zag (1975) - Aldo Minelli, le patron du bar
- Le mâle du siècle (1975) - Louis Maboul
- Le Chat et la souris (1975) - William Daube - le gauchiste
- La Course à l'échalote (1975) - Le conducteur du train en bleu (uncredited)
- Les conquistadores (1976) - Le bagarreur de la République
- L'Aile ou la cuisse (1976) - Le faux plombier
- Le Juge Fayard dit Le Shériff (1977) - Lecca - un truand
- L'ange gardien (1978) - Le parisien
- Un balcon en forêt (1978) - Le caporal Olivon
- Les Charlots en délire (1979) - Le syndicaliste
- Le règlement intérieur (1980) - Le surveillant général
- Le rose et le blanc (1982) - Henry James
- One Deadly Summer (1983) - Rostollan
- Treasure Island (1985) - French Captain
- Maine-Ocean Express (1986) - Petitgas Marcel
- Double messieurs (1986) - Roger dit Léo
- O Desejado (1987) - Laurentino
- Brigade de nuit (1987)
- La travestie (1988) - Alain
- Radio Corbeau (1989) - Le commissaire Roustan
- Dédé (1990) - Maurice, le père
- Uranus (1990) - Le brigadier
- Gawin (1991) - Pais - le garagiste
- Les arcandiers (1991) - l'Ingénieur
- À la vitesse d'un cheval au galop (1992) - Ulysse - le chauffeur du car
- L'oeil écarlate (1993) - Romain
- Le Fils de Gascogne (1995) - Himself
- Excentric paradis (1996) - Riton
- Le coeur fantôme (1996) - Le voisin
- Tenue correcte exigée (1997) - Jacquot - un SDF
- Du bleu jusqu'en Amérique (1999) - Robert
- They Call This... Spring (2001) - Monsieur Maurice - le concierge collectionneur de vidéos porno
- Fifi Martingale (2001) - Yves Lempereur
- Mischka (2002) - Robert
- Code 68 (2005) - Hubert
- Déserts (2005)
- Le crime est notre affaire (2008) - L'inspecteur Blache
- Cruel (2014) - Maurice Ouari
- Sparring (2017) - Monsieur Jean (final film role)
