= Paulo Renato =

Paulo Renato is the name of:

- Paulo Renato (actor) (1924–1981), Portuguese actor
- Paulo Renato (footballer), Portuguese footballer
- Paulo Renato Souza (1945–2011), Brazilian politician
