= Camilo Pessanha =

Portuguese poet (1867–1926)

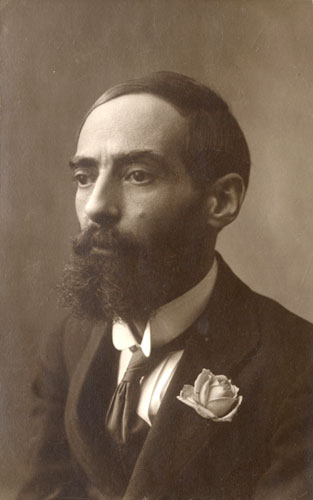
- Camilo Pessanha
- Born: Camilo de Almeida Pessanha; 7 September 1867; Coimbra, Portugal
- Died: 1 March 1926 (aged 58); Macau
- Resting place: São Miguel Arcanjo Cemetery
- Occupations: Public defender, Judge, Teacher, Poet, Writer
- Writing career
- Genres: poems, essays and translations
- Notable work: Clepsidra
- Literary movement: Symbolist poetry

Camilo de Almeida Pessanha (7 September 1867 – 1 March 1926) was a Portuguese symbolist poet.

== Biography ==
=== Early years ===
Camilo de Almeida Pessanha was born the illegitimate son of Francisco António de Almeida Pessanha, an aristocratic law student, and Maria do Espírito Santo Duarte Nunes Pereira, his housekeeper, on 7 September 1867, at 11.00 p.m., in Sé Nova, Coimbra, Portugal. The couple would have four more children.

In 1870, after his father's graduation, the family relocated to the Azores, where he had been appointed public defender. By 1878 the Pessanha family was living in Lamego, where young Camilo completed his basic schooling. In 1884 he finished his secondary studies and, following in his father's footsteps, entered law school at the Coimbra University. A year later, he wrote his first poem, Lúbrica (Lascivious). Over the course of the next several years he would pen more poems and publish some of them in local newspapers. From early 1888 up to late 1889 he interrupted his studies, owing to his frail health quite affected by depression over a broken heart.

In October 1889, he resumed his studies and began a close and lifelong friendship with António Osório de Castro, a fellow student and director of a paper where he published some his poems. Pessanha also became intimate with his friend's sister, Ana de Castro Osório, a would-be writer and pioneer feminist in Portugal. He graduated in 1890. Upon graduation, he started working as an attorney. While working, he discovered the works of French poet Paul Verlaine, which would deeply influence him.

=== Life in Macau ===
In August 1893, lured by the mysteries of the Orient, Pessanha applied for a position as philosophy teacher in the newly established gymnasium of Macau, then a Portuguese colony in distant China. He was appointed on 18 December, along with Wenceslau de Moraes, among others. On 19 February 1894, he sailed to Macau; he docked in the region on 10 April.

In 1895, he bought a Chinese concubine from a broker. Her name was Lei Ngoi Long and brought with her Ngun-Jen, her daughter. A year later, on 21 November, his son João Manuel would born. The local Portuguese conservative community was shocked by this overt relationship, but Pessanha was disdainfully indifferent to them.

Throughout the years, Pessanha would return for short stays in Portugal, due to failing health. During one of his stays he would have met Fernando Pessoa, an ardent admirer of Pessanha's poetry, influencing his work between 1909 and 1911; this was his Paulismo phase.

In spite of being thought of as an eccentric, over the years he became a central figure in the cultural, political and civic world of Macau. He was a respected teacher (of philosophy, history, geography, Portuguese literature, law), attorney and judge, and he was an adviser to the several governors of the city. In 1900, he was nominated public defender; he later became judge. To pass his time, besides composing poetry, he immersed himself in the local culture, collected Chinese art and became a respected China authority in the colony.

Pessanha died on 1 March 1926 of tuberculosis, aggravated by his chronic opium addiction. He is buried at the São Miguel Arcanjo Cemetery in Macau.

== His work ==
Since the poet had the unique talent of re-writing his works from memory and had the habit of giving his poems to close friends, many of his poems had either become lost or inadvertently destroyed. To counter this, Ana de Castro Osório urged Pessanha to place his poems in a single volume. With Pessanha's blessing, João de Castro Osório published Clepsidra (1920). In the years that followed, other poems not included in Clepsidra but attributed to Pessanha appeared in the Portuguese press. Clepsidra eventually came out in a 1945 edition and was radically re-edited in 1956. Gaspar Simões brought to light several more poems and versions of previously published poems as well as Pessanha's translations of Chinese elegies in his A Obra e o Homem: Camilo Pessanha (1967). In 1994, Paulo Franchetti authored a critical edition of Clepsidra including previously unknown fragments.

At first primarily influenced by Cesário Verde and Paul Verlaine, Pessanha became the most pure of Portuguese Symbolists. His poems greatly influenced the Geração de Orpheu from Mário de Sá-Carneiro to Fernando Pessoa.
