= Iglesia de San Miguel Arcángel (Trevías) =

- Location: Trevías, Valdés, Asturias

History
- Consecrated: March 21, 1000

Iglesia de San Miguel Arcángel (Trevías) is a church in Trevías, in the municipality of Valdés, Asturias, Spain. The church was consecrated by the counts Gundemaro Pinioliz and Mumadomna on 21 March 1000. It was rebuilt in the 19th century and was renovated and expanded in the 20th century.

== History ==
Originally a monastery in a place named Trebes, it later became a church located in Trevias. The church was consecrated by the counts Gundemaro Pinioliz and Mumadomna in 1000. (Note: According to Vigil (2003), evidence of it consecration in the year 1038 is noted in the portico's inscription.) In 1144, King Alfonso VII of León and Castile donated the Monastery to Aldonza Fernández and her niece Urraca Bermúdez, and upon her death, to the Monastery of San Vicente de Oviedo.

== Architecture ==
No remains of the original foundation are preserved in the interior or exterior.

The current church was rebuilt in the 19th century and underwent further expansion and renovation the following century.

In the portico, is a tombstone inscription in pink limestone which commemorates the completion of the early church on 21 March 1000. The church has a rectangular floor plan with three naves. The central nave is broader and taller than the ones flanking it and are separated by semicircular arches. The church has a flat roof.

The wall behind the main altarpiece features a large fresco of the patron saint. The main altarpiece in the apse is of the Archangel Gabriel and dates to 1749. There are images of Saint Michael (centre) Saint Lucy (to the left) and Saint Blaise (to the right) in three niches. In the left aisle is an altarpiece of the Rosary, dated to 1738, and in the right isle is an altarpiece of Christ, dated to 1766.

== See also ==
- Asturian art
- Catholic Church in Spain
- Churches in Asturias
- List of oldest church buildings
