= Le Chat et la souris =

1975 film

Le Chat et la Souris
- Directed by: Claude Lelouch
- Written by: Claude Lelouch
- Starring: Michèle Morgan; Serge Reggiani; Jean-Pierre Aumont
- Cinematography: Jean Collomb
- Edited by: Georges Klotz
- Music by: Francis Lai
- Production company: Les Films 13
- Distributed by: Les Films 13
- Release date: 3 September 1975
- Running time: 108 min
- Country: France
- Language: French

Le Chat et la Souris (US title: Cat and Mouse, also known as Seven Suspects for Murder) is a 1975 French mystery film directed and written by Claude Lelouch. The film stars Michèle Morgan, Serge Reggiani and Jean-Pierre Aumont.

It tells the story of a rich widow, whose philandering husband is killed, and an inspector tries to solve the murder mystery.

== Plot ==
Inspectors Lechat and Chemin investigate the death of Parisian property developer Richard, who was found dead in his office after threatening to divorce his wife. The theft of valuable paintings leads Lechat to suspect the widow, who stands to benefit from an insurance payout, despite her alibi. After she is kidnapped and the money stolen, a senior police official closes the case and forces Lechat into early retirement. Lechat continues investigating independently, writing a book about the case and staying in contact with the widow as their relationship develops.

== Cast ==
- Michèle Morgan as Madame Richard
- Serge Reggiani as Lechat
- Philippe Léotard as Pierre Chemin
- Jean-Pierre Aumont as Monsieur Richard
- Valérie Lagrange as Manuelle
- Michel Peyrelon as Germain
- Christine Laurent as Christine
- Philippe Labro as Philippe Lacombe
- Jacques François as Le préfet de police
- Arlette Emmery as Rose
- Jean Mermet
- Anne Libert as Anne
- Judith Magre as The lady with the dog
- Yves Afonso as William Daube - le gauchiste
