= Wenceslau de Moraes =

Portuguese writer (1854–1929)

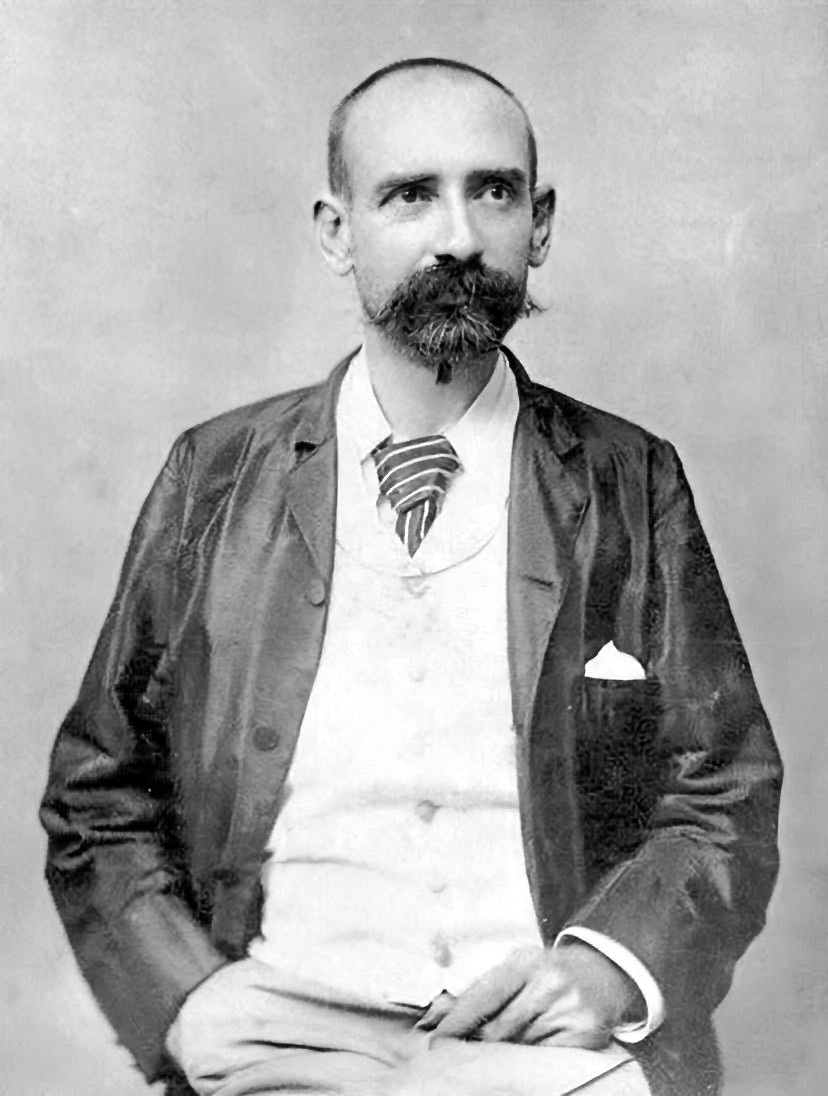
- Moraes in Kobe, 1897
- Born: Wenceslau José de Sousa de Moraes; 30 May 1854; Lisbon, Kingdom of Portugal
- Died: 1 July 1929 (aged 75); Tokushima, Japan
- Occupations: Writer, naval officer, diplomat
- Known for: explaining Japan in Portuguese

Wenceslau José de Souza de Moraes (30 May 1854 – 1 July 1929), in modern orthography Venceslau José de Sousa de Morais, was a Portuguese writer whose works were steeped in orientalism and exoticism, particularly the culture of Japan. He has been compared to Lafcadio Hearn, a contemporary who settled in Japan but wrote in English. A translator of Haiku, his verse was also influenced by Symbolism.

== Biography ==
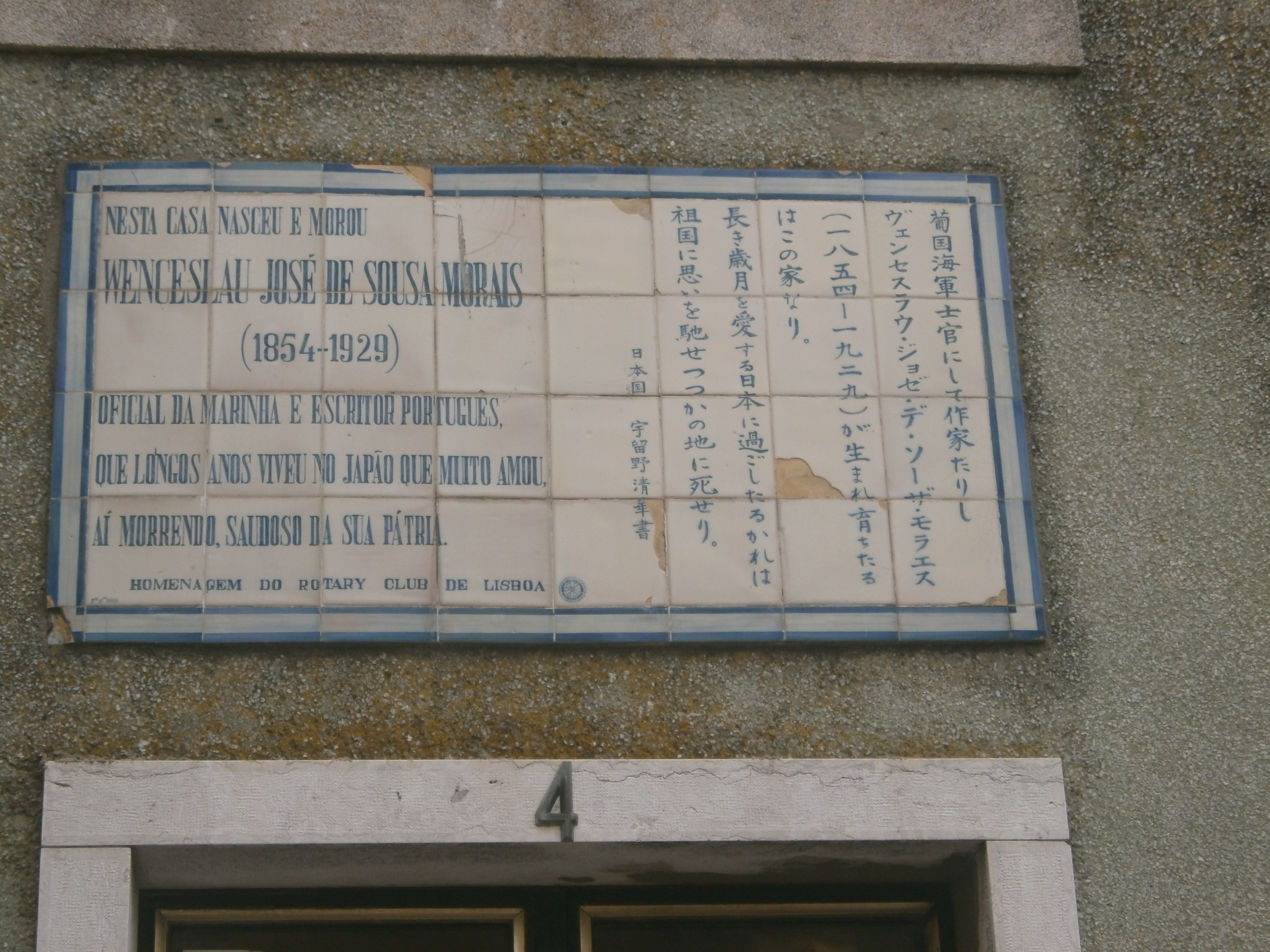
Tile plaque in his home in Lisbon

Born into a bourgeois family of modest wealth in Lisbon, Moraes wrote his first poems in 1872 at the age of 18. After studying at the Naval College, he was commissioned a lieutenant in 1875 and served aboard warships based in Portuguese Mozambique. In 1889, he was promoted to commander and assigned to assist the Captain of the Port of Portuguese Macau. While there he first began writing his Traços do Extremo Oriente, married an Anglo-Chinese woman named Atchan (from whom he separated in 1893), and visited Siam, Portuguese Timor, and Japan (the last nearly every year).

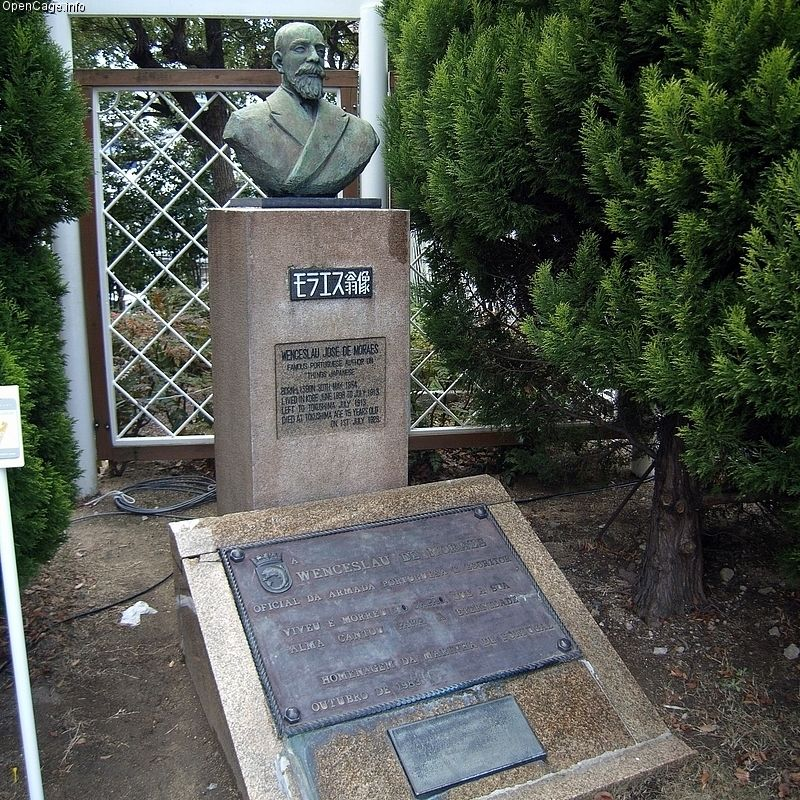
Wenceslau de Moraes memorial in Kobe, Japan

In 1899, he abandoned his naval career and became consul of Portugal's first consulate for Kobe and Osaka, Japan. Increasingly fascinated by Japan, he converted to Buddhism and married a former geisha named Fukumoto Yone in a Shinto ceremony. Grief-stricken after her death in 1912, he resigned his position as consul, severed all relations with the Portuguese Navy and foreign ministry, and moved to Yone's home city of Tokushima, where he lived with her niece Koharu and visited her grave every day. In chapter 41 of his book O "Bon-Odori" em Tokushima (1916) he explains why he chose to live the remainder of his life not among the living, but among memories of the deceased. After Koharu died in 1916, he made daily visits to the graves of both women, whom he memorialized in 1923, by which time he had become a hermit, increasingly Japanese in lifestyle, but increasingly resented by his Japanese neighbors. He died alone in 1929, at the age of 75.

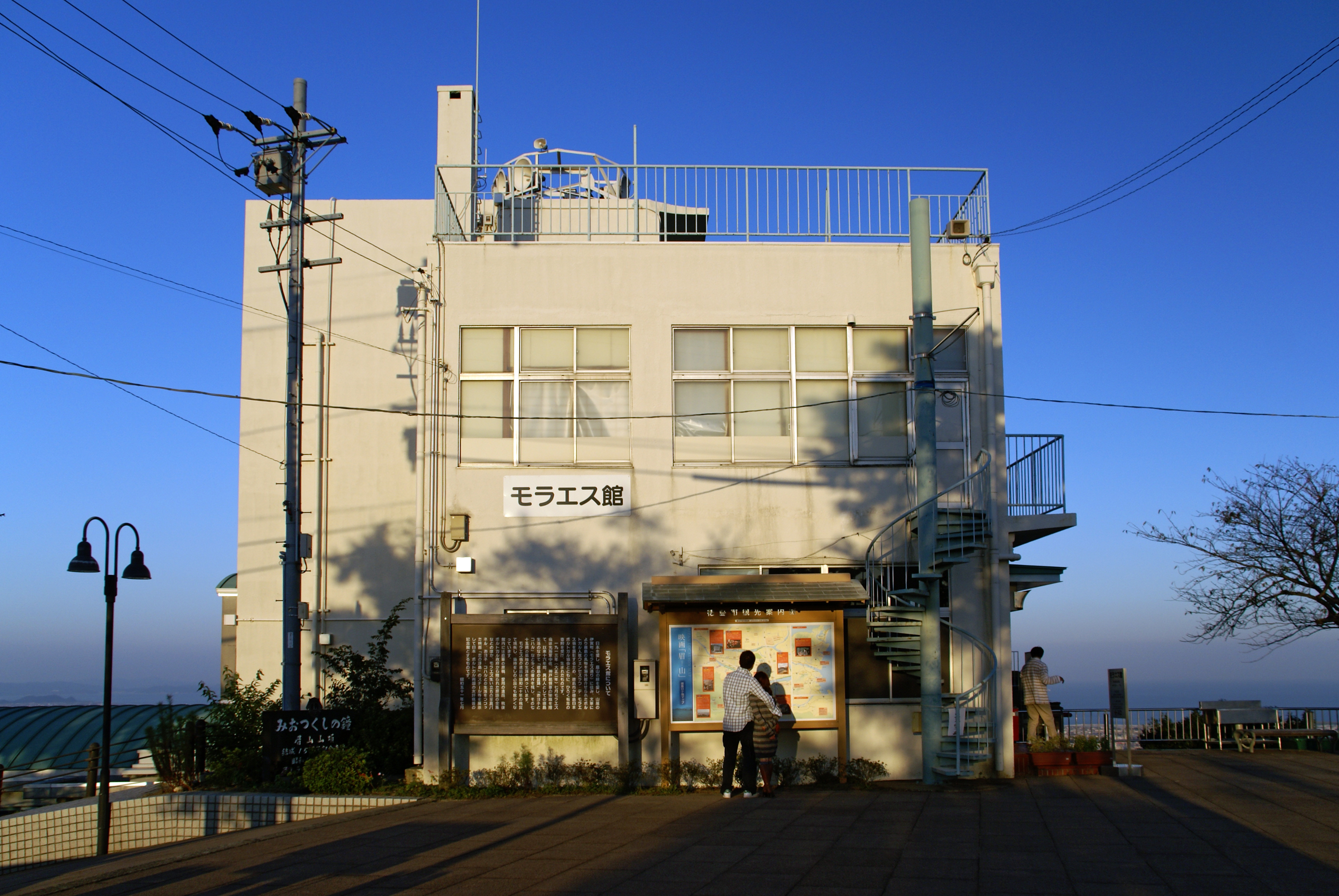
Moraes Museum atop Mount Bizan

Moraes and his works remained largely unknown in Japan until the seventh-year Buddhist memorial service for him on 1 July 1935, when Jiroh Yumoto, the local superintendent of schools (from Nagano Prefecture), encouraged the Ministry of Foreign Affairs and Ministry of Education to publicize his work. He is now remembered in a small museum atop Mount Bizan in Tokushima City.

== Films ==
Paulo Rocha's film A Ilha dos Amores (1982) is about the life and loves of Moraes in Macau and Japan.

== Bibliography ==
- Traços do Extremo Oriente — Sião, China e Japão (1895)
- Moraes, Wenceslau de (1897), Dai-Nippon.
- Moraes, Wenceslau de (1904), Cartas do Japão [Letters from Japan] (in Portuguese).
- Cartas do Japão, A Vida Japonesa: 3ª Série (1905–1906) (1907)
- O Culto do Chá (1905)
- Paisagens da China e do Japão (1906)
- O "Bon-Odori" em Tokushima (1916)
- Fernão Mendes Pinto no Japão (1920)
- O-Yoné e Kó-Haru (1923)
- Moraes, Wenceslau de (1924), Paisagens da China e do Japão [Landscapes of China and Japan] (in Portuguese).
- Os Serões no Japão (1925)
- Relance da Alma Japonesa (1926)
- Osoroshi (1933).
