= Juhl (Las Vegas) =

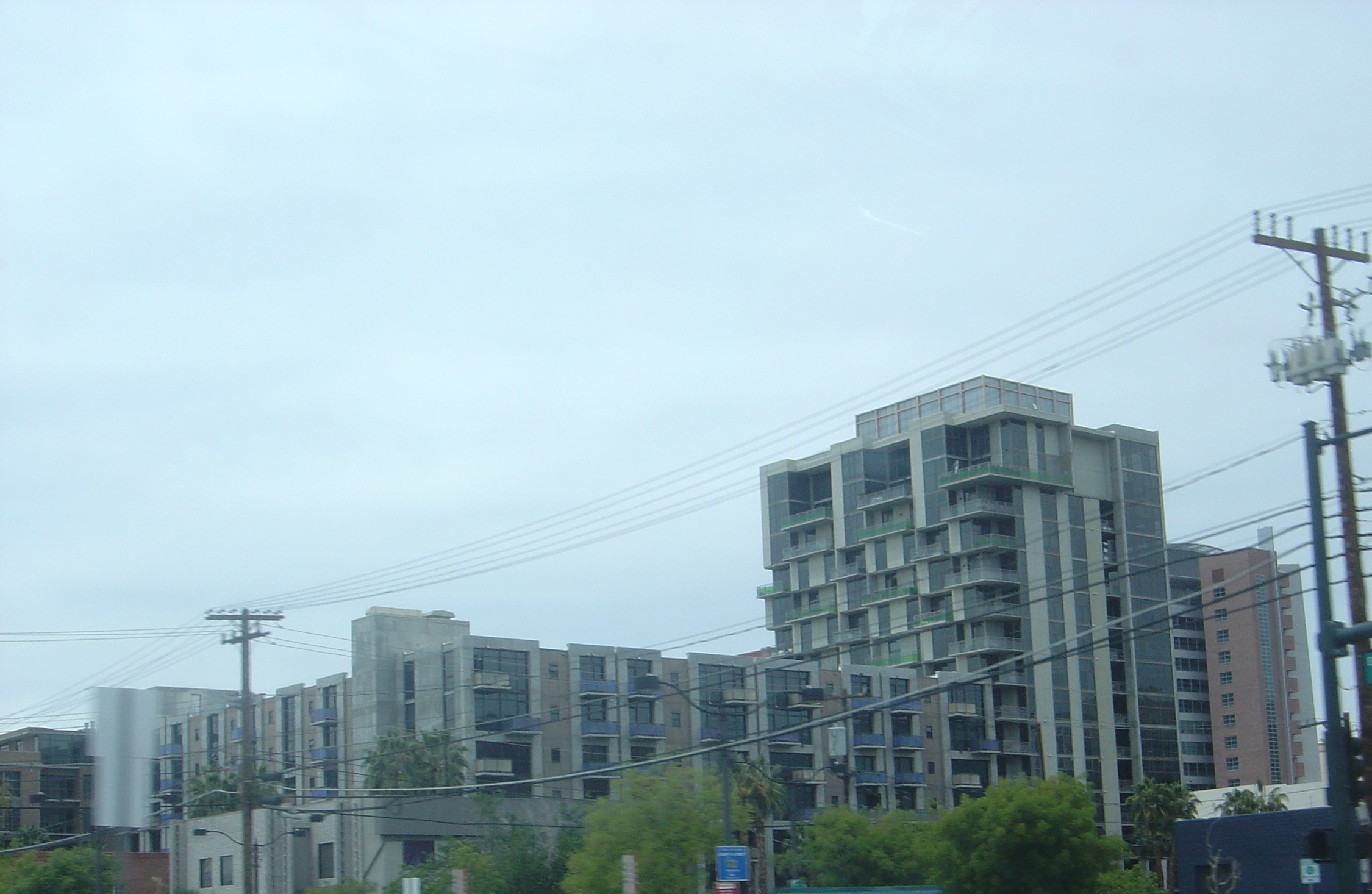
- Juhl residential buildings in 2020
- Interactive map of the Juhl area

General information
- Type: Condominiums, retail, restaurants
- Location: Downtown Las Vegas, Nevada, 353 East Bonneville Avenue, United States
- Coordinates: 36.163681°N 115.146469°W
- Groundbreaking: Mid-March 2006
- Topped-out: August 2007 (15-story tower)
- Opened: June 2009
- Cost: $178 million

Design and construction
- Architecture firm: Martinez + Cutri Corporation
- Developer: CityMark Development
- Structural engineer: Glotman Simpson
- Main contractor: Turner Construction

Other information
- Number of units: 344

Juhl is a mixed-use property in downtown Las Vegas, Nevada. It features six residential buildings, including a 15-story condominium tower, in addition to restaurants and retailers. Groundbreaking took place in 2006, but construction delays pushed the opening back more than a year. It opened in June 2009, with 341 condominium units, but buyers had difficulty finalizing their condo purchases due to the effects of the Great Recession. In 2013, Juhl's 306 unsold units were sold to a partnership of companies, which turned them into rentals and, in 2017, began putting the rental units back up for sale as condominiums.

== History ==
=== Construction ===
The 2.4-acre (0.97 ha) property, located in downtown Las Vegas, was initially occupied by four houses. The Las Vegas Redevelopment Agency solicited proposals from approximately a dozen companies across the United States to develop the land. CityMark Development, of San Diego, was ultimately chosen in 2004. CityMark purchased the property for $5.2 million in 2005, and planned to build Juhl, a $167 million mixed-use and condo project. Juhl would include six towers, standing between six and 15 stories, with a total of 341 condominium units. The project would include 24,000 sq ft (2,200 m^{2}) of retail space, while parking would be located on the first five floors. CityMark had previously reinvigorated San Diego's downtown Gaslamp Quarter area.

Groundbreaking took place in mid-March 2006, with the opening scheduled for April 2008. The houses on the property were demolished, and by April 2006, $600,000 of underground work and the relocation of utilities had begun on the site. Turner Construction was the general contractor, while San Diego–based Martinez + Cutri Corporation was the architect. Glotman Simpson of Vancouver was the structural engineer. Corus Bank provided $106 million to fund the project. In August 2006, 600 cubic yards of concrete were delivered by more than 75 trucks for the foundation of the project.

The target demographic consisted of young professionals who desired to live near the Las Vegas Arts District. In December 2006, approximately 60 percent of Juhl's units had been sold through binding purchase agreements. Many of the buyers were people who worked downtown, such as lawyers and judges. That month, construction crews poured the third and fourth floors of the residential and parking structures for the project. Approximately 115 construction workers were on the site at that time, with the number expected to increase to 200 to 225 within the following 15 to 18 months. In July 2007, several businesses were being planned for the new project, including a bar, a coffee shop, and a jewelry store. Three cranes were used during construction of the 15-story tower, which was topped off in August 2007, with the first residents expected to move in by May 2008. At that time, 70 percent of Juhl's units had been sold.

Juhl remained under construction in June 2008. The planned opening was delayed by more than a year, due to construction issues. A person involved in the project said there were significant engineering issues on the project: "There was no post-tensioning or reinforcing steel to support the concrete. The floor slabs deflected two to three inches between the columns. It was so bad that the glass didn't fit, the interior walls were cracking, and water lines were breaking." CityMark said the delay was due to "typical" project delays, while the Las Vegas Redevelopment Agency said that minor and major structural modifications were made to the project.

=== Operation ===
Juhl ultimately opened in June 2009, with little fanfare. The project was valued at $178 million. As a result of its delayed opening, the project suffered the effects of the Great Recession. Juhl featured 341 units, but only 21 units (six percent) had closed escrow, and CityMark began offering discounts to buyers who did finalize their purchases. Much of Juhl's retail space was also vacant.

ST Residential, at a cost of $14 million, purchased the project after the failure of Corus Bank in September 2009. In August 2011, Juhl still had 307 units left unsold. In 2013, ST Residential sold Juhl's 306 unsold units to a partnership between KRE Capital, based in California, and Dune Real Estate Partners, based in New York. The companies purchased the units under the name DK Las Vegas. Juhl's unsold units were turned into rentals, and the property was 95 percent occupied as of 2015. In 2016, the Juhl began offering an artist-in-residence program.

On March 23, 2017, it was announced that Juhl's unsold units would be put on sale in late April 2017, while renewing some rental agreements to keep the building occupied. In 2018, the Juhl partnered with The Believer to begin a writer-in-residence program on the property. The program allowed writers to live and work in a Juhl loft with an attached studio. By 2022 the remaining condos were nearly fully sold.

== Features ==
Juhl has a total of six residential buildings, which connect to each other. The Juhl property spans a city block, and includes 344 condominium units, some of which are located within the 15-story tower, the tallest building on the site. Units range from 600 sq ft (56 m^{2}) to nearly 2,000 sq ft (190 m^{2}). The 10th floor features a lounge known as Vino Deck. Juhl also includes a pool, an outdoor movie theater, and a CrossFit gym. A bike store opened at Juhl in 2013. In 2015, lease agreements were signed for six businesses – including restaurants and retailers – to open at the base of the complex. A 20,000 sq ft (1,900 m^{2}) area on the ground floor, known as The Promenade at Juhl, celebrated its opening on November 17, 2016. It contains various businesses, including restaurants and retailers. The mixed use promenade has been cited as a model for other off-strip developments in Las Vegas.
