= Santiagu (Valdés) =

- Parish
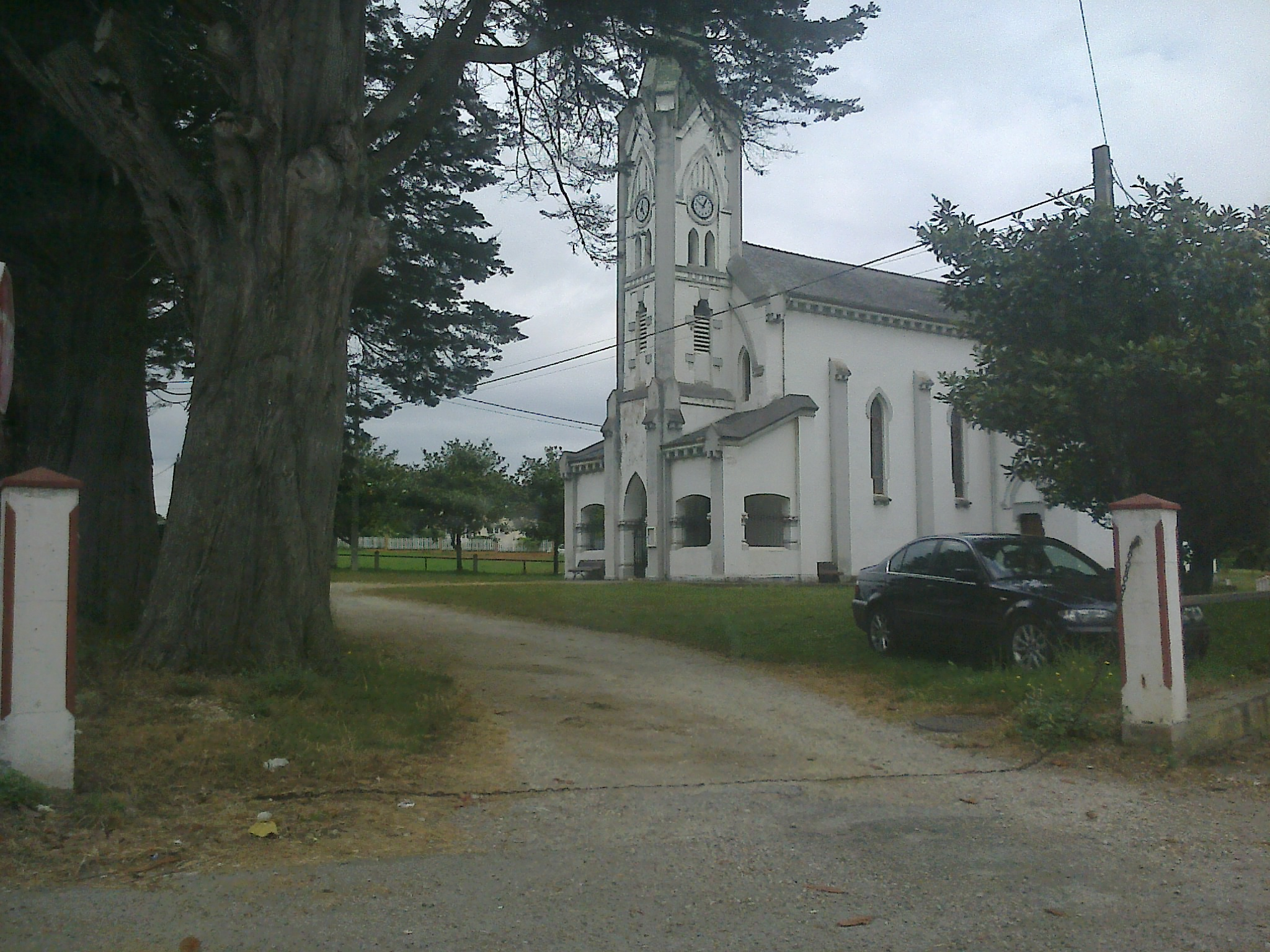
- Church of Santiagu
- Interactive map of Santiagu
- Country: Spain
- Autonomous community: Asturias
- Province: Asturias
- Municipality: Valdés

Population
  - Total: 1,336 (2,005)

Santiagu is a parish located in Valdés, a municipality within the province and autonomous community of Asturias, in northern Spain.

== Villages and minor entities ==
=== Villages ===
- Albarde
- Acalcabu
- Costancios
- El Vaḷḷín
- Grandavil
- L'Outeiru
- La Corripia
- La Ferreiría de Baxu
- La Granda
- La Mata
- La Ronda
- Las Pontigas
- Muanes
- Piedrafita
- Ribadebaxu
- Ribadecima
- Saliente
- Samartín
- San Xustu
- Santiagu
- Setienes
- Taborcías
- Valtraviesu
- Vistalegre
- Viḷḷuír

=== Hamlets ===
Acalcabu

- La Bouzona
- La Cruz
- La Perona
- La Queimadina

Costancios

- El Molinón
- El Penéu Zapateiru
- El Xuegu
- La Casa la Veiga
- La Viḷḷa

El Vaḷḷín

- El Soirón
- La Braña d'Arriba
- La Braña de Baxu
- Las Paradinas

La Granda

- El Marianáu
- La Bouzona
- La Granda de Riba

La Mata

- El Molín
- La Fábrica
- La Pralina
- Los Campones

La Ronda

- Las Ranas
- La Ronda Baxu
- La Ronda Riba

Muanes

- El Calvariu
- La Corripa
- La Ḷḷomba
- La Ḷḷombina
- Trabaz

Ribadecima

- Las Cruces

Samartín

- Barzanieḷḷa
- El Molín
- La Rasa
- La Viḷḷa

Setienes

- El Campu las Cruces
- El Palaciu
- El Penéu
- El Tamborieḷḷu
- La Calea
- La Fonte
- La Sienra

Taborcías

- El Palaciu

Valtraviesu

- El Pimientu
- La Calea Baxu
- La Calea Riba
- La Calea'l Mediu
- La Cháxina
- La Rabera
- Refoyéu

Viḷḷuír

- La Calea
