= River of Gold (1998 film) =

1998 film

- Portuguese: O Rio do Ouro
- Directed by: Paulo Rocha
- Written by: Paulo Rocha; Regina Guimarães; Cláudia Tomaz
- Produced by: Nicolas Daguet
- Starring: Isabel Ruth
- Cinematography: Elso Roque
- Edited by: José Edgar Feldman
- Release date: 18 May 1998
- Running time: 95 minutes
- Country: Portugal
- Language: Portuguese

River of Gold (Portuguese: O Rio do Ouro) is a 1998 Portuguese drama film directed by Paulo Rocha. It was screened in the Un Certain Regard section at the 1998 Cannes Film Festival.

== Cast ==
- Isabel Ruth as Carolina
- Lima Duarte as António
- Joana Bárcia as Mélita
- João Cardoso as Zé dos Ouros
- José Mário Branco as Blindman
- António Capelo as Joaquim
- Filipe Cochofel as João
- António João Rodrigues as Boy
- Alice Silva as Laundry Woman
- Vitalina Beleza as Laundry Woman
- Absinte Abramovici as Laundry Woman
- Joana Mayer as Laundry Woman
- Saguenail as Photographer
- Maria José Marinho as Godmother
- Marco Fernandes as Man
- Pedro Santos as Violin Boy
- Diana Sá as Flower Saleswoman
- João Pedro Bénard
