= Laurdal =

Norwegian barque

History

Norway
- Name: Laurdal
- Out of service: 13 March 1876
- Fate: wrecked at Eierlandse Gat, Texel, the Netherlands on 12 March 1876

General characteristics
- Type: Barque
- Crew: 14

Laurdal was a Norwegian barque in the 19th century.

== Fate ==
In 1876 the ship was sailing with captain Gramnas, from Drøbak to Limmerik with a cargo of ice.

Due to a Northwestern storm the ship wrecked in the evening of 12 March 1876 at Eierlandse Gat, “30 minutes” off the coast of Texel, the Netherlands. It was discovered the next morning of 13 March 1876. Early in the morning the mayor, commission members of the Noord- en Zuid-Hollandsche Reddingmaatschappij and the vice-consul of Norway and Sweden arrived. A lifeboat was quickly prepared. However, At 11am (local time) the boat could not enter the water due to bad weather. At the moment only a few parts of the masts of the ship were still visible. When the boat went to the ship, the first attempt to reach the wreckage and to save the people on board failed. After three hours of trying to reach the ship, they gave up and turned back. It was described as heartbreaking how the crew members were screaming after the lifeboat returned. The rescuers stated that a second attempt was impossible due to the weather. Other sailors on the beach from Oudeschild offered to attempt a rescue. However, the described as courageous, Jan Stark was able to convince his crew to try it again. The storm had calmed down a bit in the meantime. They managed to reach the ship and an hour later all 14 crew members were rescued. The next day the boat was completely destroyed and nothing could be salvaged.

== Reactions ==
Pastor J.A. Scholte thanked extensively the rescue companies and particularly all the rescue workers by name at advertisement space in multiple newspapers.

Dutch painter Cornelis Christiaan Dommersen made a painting of the rescue effort.

In October 1876, the King of Sweden and Norway Oscar II appointed the vice-consul in Texel, Mr. Coninck Westenberg, as knight of the Order of St. Olav as a reward for the efforts to save the crew of the Laurdal. Also, an amount of 200 Guilder was given to the people who helped in this rescue effort.
