= O Desejado =

- Directed by: Paulo Rocha
- Written by: Antoine Lacomblez; Manuel de Lucena; Paulo Rocha; Jorge Silva Melo
- Based on: novel The Tale of Genji by Shikibu Murasaki
- Produced by: Paulo Rocha; Patrick Sandrin
- Starring: Luís Miguel Cintra
- Cinematography: Kôzô Okazaki
- Music by: Philippe Hersant
- Release date: 1987
- Languages: Portuguese; French

O Desejado (French: Les montagnes de la lune, also known as O Desejado ou As Montanhas da Lua and Mountains Of The Moon) is a 1987 Portuguese-French drama film written and directed by Paulo Rocha and starring Luís Miguel Cintra.

The film was entered into the main competition at the 44th edition of the Venice Film Festival. The production of the film, and the experience of Yves Afonso, a French actor of Portuguese descent who first visited Portugal because of this film, later inspired Voyage to the Beginning of the World by Manoel de Oliveira.

== Cast ==
- Luís Miguel Cintra as João
- Caroline Chaniolleau as Antonia
- Yves Afonso as Laurentino
- Jacques Bonnaffé as Tiago
- Manuela de Freitas as Isabel
- Isabel Ruth as Virginia
- Isabel de Castro as Housekeeper
