= Paulo Rocha (film director) =

Portuguese film director (1935–2012)

- Born: Paulo Soares da Rocha; 22 December 1935; Porto, Portugal
- Died: 29 December 2012 (aged 77); Vila Nova de Gaia, Portugal
- Education: University of Lisbon; Institut des hautes études cinématographiques
- Occupations: Film director, screenwriter
- Movement: Novo Cinema Português

Paulo Soares da Rocha (22 December 1935 – 29 December 2012) was a Portuguese film director. Among his best-known films are A Ilha dos Amores and O Rio do Ouro. A Ilha dos Amores was entered into the 1982 Cannes Film Festival, O Desejado was entered into the main competition at the 44th edition of the Venice Film Festival, and O Rio do Ouro was screened in the Un Certain Regard section at the 1998 Festival.

== Filmography as director ==
- Os Verdes Anos (1963)
- Mudar de Vida (1966)
- Sever do Vouga... Uma Experiência (1971)
- A Pousada das Chagas (1972)
- A Ilha dos Amores (1982)
- O Desejado (1988)
- "Cinéma, de Notre Temps": Oliveira - L'Architecte (1993)
- Portugaru San - O Sr. Portugal em Tokushima (1993)
- Shohei Imamura: The Free Thinker (1995)
- Camões - Tanta Guerra, Tanto Engano (1998)
- O Rio do Ouro (1998)
- A Raiz do Coração (2000)
- As Sereias (2001)
- Vanitas (2004)
- Se Eu Fosse Ladrão, Roubava (2011)

== Bibliographic references ==
- (in Portuguese) O Cais do Olhar by José de Matos-Cruz, Portuguese Cinematheque, 1999
