= Juan Barcia Caballero =

Spanish physician and writer

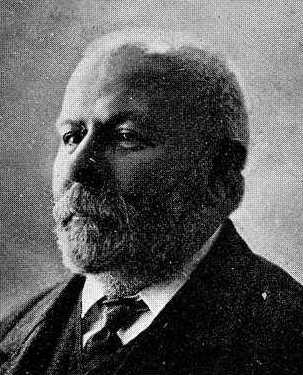
Juan Barcia Caballero

Juan Barcia Caballero (1852–1926) was a Spanish physician and writer. He wrote in Galician and Spanish.

== Biography ==
Caballero studied medicine in Santiago and Madrid and was professor at the universities of Granada and Santiago de Compostela. He was also director of San Roque Hospital and Asylum Conxo in Santiago. He had regionalist ideologies and participated in the constitution of the Galician Regionalist Association.

== Works ==
- La cuestión palpitante. Cartas amistosas a la Sra. Dª Emilia Pardo Bazán (1881)
- Mesa revuelta. Ensayos literarios (1883, bilingüe gallego-castellano)
- Rimas (1891, poesía, en gallego)
- Dos almas (1907, novel, in collaboration with his son John Barcia Eleizegui)
- El señor Nin (1922, novel, in collaboration with his son John Barcia Eleizegui)
