= National Cultural Centre =

National Cultural Centre may refer to:

Ghana

- Centre for National Culture (Kumasi), Kumasi

Guyana

- National Cultural Centre (Guyana), Georgetown

Uganda

- Uganda National Cultural Centre, Kampala

United States

- John F. Kennedy Center for the Performing Arts or (until 1964) the National Cultural Center, Washington, D.C.
- National Hispanic Cultural Center, Albuquerque, New Mexico
