= Sumiko Gutiérrez =

Mexican footballer (born 1988)

Personal information
- Full name: Sumiko Gutiérrez Vera
- Date of birth: 15 June 1988 (age 38)
- Place of birth: Mexico City, Mexico
- Height: 1.58 m (5 ft 2 in)
- Position: Left-back

Senior career*
Years	Team	Apps	(Gls)
2019–2022	Pachuca	75	(0)
2022–2024	Juárez	61	(2)
2024–2026	Toluca	34	(0)
- * Club domestic league appearances and goals as of 31 January 2026

Sumiko Gutiérrez Vera (born 15 June 1988) is a Mexican professional footballer who plays as a Left-back.

== Career ==
In 2019, she started her career in Pachuca. In 2022, she was transferred to Juárez. In 2024, she joined to Toluca.
