= Outur (Valdés) =

Coordinates: 43.533333°N 6.58°W

- Parish
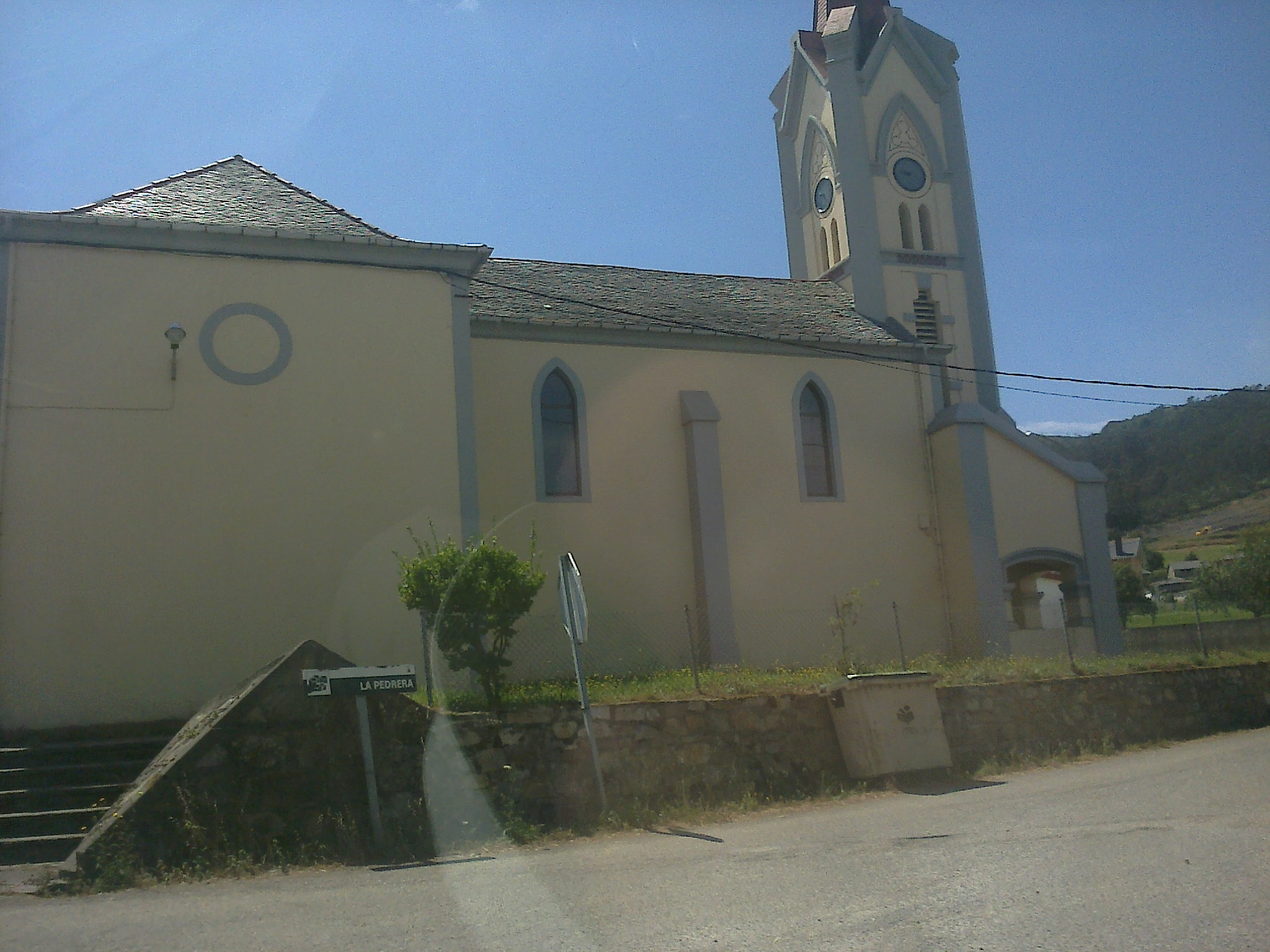
- Church of Otur
- Interactive map of Outur
- Country: Spain
- Autonomous community: Asturias
- Province: Asturias
- Municipality: Valdés

Population
  - Total: 433 (2,008)

Outur is a parish located in Valdés, a municipality within the province and Autonomous Community of Asturias, in northern Spain.

== Transport ==
Otur is located in the N-634 road. The parish has a FEVE station at the Ferrol–Gijón line.

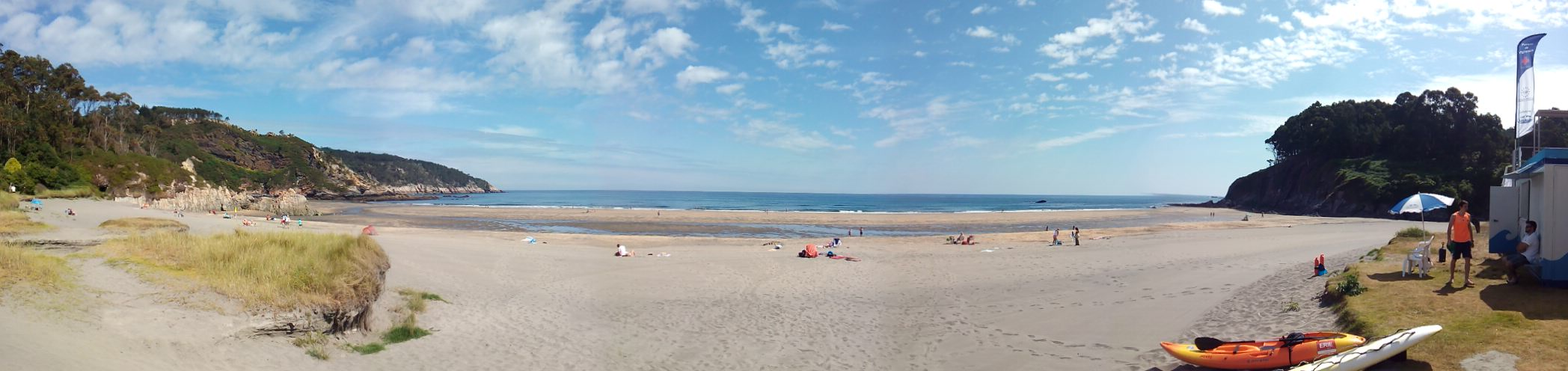
Panoramical view of the sea from the beach of Outur.

== Town list ==
- Boronas
- Canéu
  - Las Prales
  - Las Torres
  - Los Umeiros
- La Barraca
  - Sabugu
- Otur
  - Las Cabornas
  - La Fervencia
  - La Calea
  - Carral
  - La Casona
  - La Cruz
  - La Ḷḷañada
  - Palaciu
  - La Pedrera
  - El Pinieḷḷu
  - Las Pontigas
  - El Reḷḷón
  - Riucanéu
  - Riumayor
  - Los Romedios
  - L'Ayalga
  - Viḷḷar
  - Las Casas de la Playa
