= José Rubia Barcia =

Galician translator (1914–1997)

José Rubia Barcia (1914–1997) was born in Ferrol (Galicia), where a cultural center dedicated to him now houses his library and a collection of his papers. He studied Arabic and Hispano-Arabic literature at the University of Granada. After completing his degree he held important positions in the Spanish Republican Army during the Spanish Civil War and as a consequence he went into exile, first to France and then to Cuba and then to the United States. Here he worked in Hollywood with the Spanish film director Luis Buñuel. Rubia Barcia published a great number of books and articles on Valle Inclán, Unamuno, Federico García Lorca and other writers of the 20th century. He was also an author of political essays.

Rubia and Clayton Eshleman jointly prepared The Complete Posthumous Poetry of César Vallejo (1978) and won the U.S. National Book Award, category Translation.
