= Joana Bárcia =

Portuguese actress and director (born 1972)

Joana Bárcia (born 29 March 1972) is a Portuguese actress and director. Her film credits include Cinzento e Negro, River of Gold, A Filha and A Raiz do Coração. Her television credits include the co-starring role of Hermínia in mini-series O Dia do Regicídio.

Bárcia has been a director with the television series Belmonte and Mulheres.
