= Paulo Renato (actor) =

Portuguese actor

Paul Renato
- Born: Paulo Renato; 23 October 1924; Lisbon, Portugal
- Died: 26 September 1981 (aged 56); Lisbon, Portugal
- Occupation: Actor
- Years active: 1946-1980

Paulo Renato (23 October 1924-26 September 1981) was a Portuguese actor. He appeared in numerous plays and films and became very popular in Portugal during the 1950s and 1960s.

== Career ==
Born in Lisbon on 23 October 1924, he started his career in 1946, with the theater group Pedro Bom. As a stage actor, his most notable appearance was in the play A Severa (1955), where he starred alongside Amália Rodrigues. He also made cinema — Sol e Toiros (1949), Quando o Mar Galgou a Terra (1954), Os Verdes Anos (1963) e Estrada da Vida (1968) among other films. He appeared in Portuguese and international TV series — such as Ivone a Faz Tudo (1978), Millionen nach Maß (1970) or Le Comte de Monte-Cristo (1980) — and TV shows — like Zip-Zip (1969), where he made some comical sketches with Raul Solnado.

Paulo Renato died on 26 September 1981.
