= Sumiko Haneda =

Sumiko Haneda (Japanese: 羽田澄子; born 3 January 1926) is a Japanese film director.She is one of the prominent post-war documentary filmmakers in Japan who speaks for women and their roles in society through the portrayal of these themes in her films.Haneda also played a role in the establishment of the Tokyo International Women’s Film Festival (1985-2012), the first event of its kind in Japan.

== Life and career ==
Haneda was born in 1926 in Dalian, Manchuria. In 1942 she graduated from Lushun High School for Girls. She moved from Manchuria and after graduating from Jiyu Gakuen Women's High School, in 1950 she joined Iwanami Film Productions, an affiliated company that had no capital relationship with Iwanami Shoten.

In 1950, Haneda joined Iwanami Productions (i.e. a company producing educational films) as an editor for the Iwanami Photo Library, which was a publication that served as a training platform for the studio’s young filmmakers, and she remained in this role until 1958. In 1957, Haneda collaborated with another female director, Tokieda Toshie, to co-direct her first film, "Women’s College in the Village."

In 1977, she independently produced "Usuzumi no Sakura" for the first time over four years. At the Iwanami Hall screening with three other films, Etsuko Takano, the general manager, changes the practice of free admission by taking the first admission fee for a documentary film commercial screening.

In 1980, she retired from Iwanami Productions. About 80 works during her tenure. After that, she became a freelancer and works at Jiyu Kobo, a documentary film production company led by her husband, producer Mitsuru Kudo. She is involved in documentary films in various genres such as traditional performing arts, welfare, art, and modern history.

In 1982, she completed Hayachine no Fu, which she had been working on while she was still working, as her second independent film after. At Iwanami Hall, the long roadshow of the 3-hour long documentary from May 29 to June 25 was said to be an adventure, but it turned out to be a record success and will be re-screened for a week on August 7 . She establishes herself as a documentary filmmaker.

== Filmography ==
- Village Women's Class (1957)
- Usuzumi no Sakura (The Cherry Tree with Gray Blossoms) (1977)
- Future of Hayachine (1982)
- " AKIKO-Portrait of a Dancer " (1985)
- " The World of Dementia " (1986)
- "To grow old in peace" (1990)
- " Kabuki Actor Nizaemon Kataoka Wakaayu Volume, Human Performance Volume, Magoemon Volume" (1991)
- "Kabuki Actor Nizaemon Kataoka Tosen" (1994)
- "The problem is from now on-Continued: Welfare of the town chosen by the residents" (1999)
- “ The Life of Raiteu Hiratsuka: In the Beginning, Women Were the Sun ” (2001)
- "Yamanaka Tokiwa" (2004)
- "All's well that ends well" (2006)
- " Ah Manchurian Pioneers " (2008)
- " Far Away Home - Lushun, Dalian " (2011)
- "And AKIKO is... a portrait of a dancer" (2013)
