= List of Portuguese films of the 1980s =

1980s Portuguese films

The following is a list of films produced in the Cinema of Portugal ordered by year of release in the 1980s. For an alphabetical list of Portuguese films see Category:Portuguese films.

== 1980s ==
Title	Director	Cast	Notes	
1980
Manhã Submersa (Morning Mist / Submersed Morning)	Lauro António			Entered into the 12th Moscow International Film Festival
Passagem ou A Meio Caminho	Jorge Silva Melo			
1981
Cerromaior	Luís Filipe Rocha			
Francisca	Manoel de Oliveira			
Oxalá (Leave It to God)	António-Pedro Vasconcelos			8 May 1981
Rita	José Ribeiro Mendes			
Kilas, o Mau da Fita	José Fonseca e Costa			
The Territory	Raúl Ruiz			
1982
A Ilha dos Amores	Paulo Rocha			Co-production with Japan
Conversa Acabada	João Botelho			
Silvestre	João César Monteiro			
1983
Dans la ville blanche (In the White City)	Alain Tanner			Co-production with Switzerland and the United Kingdom
Dina e Django	Solveig Nordlund			
Sem Sombra de Pecado (No Trace of Sin)	José Fonseca e Costa			
Um S Marginal	José de Sá Caetano			
1984
Crónica dos Bons Malandros	Fernando Lopes			
O Lugar do Morto	António-Pedro Vasconcelos			
Os Abismos da Meia-Noite	António de Macedo			
Sinais de Vida	Luís Filipe Rocha			
1985
Le soulier de satin (The Satin Slipper)	Manoel de Oliveira			
1986
Azul, Azul	José de Sá Caetano			
Á Flor do Mal	João César Monteiro			
Um Adeus Português	João Botelho			
Uma Rapariga no Verão	Vítor Gonçalves			
1987
Agosto (August)	Jorge Silva Melo			
Balada da Praia dos Cães	José Fonseca e Costa			Co-production with Spain
O Querido Lilás	Artur Semedo			
O Bobo	José Álvaro Morais			
1988
A Mulher do Próximo	José Fonseca e Costa			
Matar Saudades	Fernando Lopes			
Os Canibais (The Cannibals)	Manoel de Oliveira			Entered into the 1988 Cannes Film Festival
Os Emissários de Khalom	António de Macedo			
Tempos Difíceis (Hard Times)	João Botelho			
Três Menos Eu (Three Less Me)	João Canijo			
Uma Pedra no Bolso	Joaquim Pinto			
1989
Recordações da Casa Amarela (Recollections of the Yellow House)	João César Monteiro			
O Sangue (The Blood)	Pedro Costa			
Onde Bate o Sol (Where the Sun Beats)	Joaquim Pinto			
Relação Fiel e Verdadeira	Margarida Gil			
