= Ricardo Costa (director) =

Portuguese film director (1940–2021)

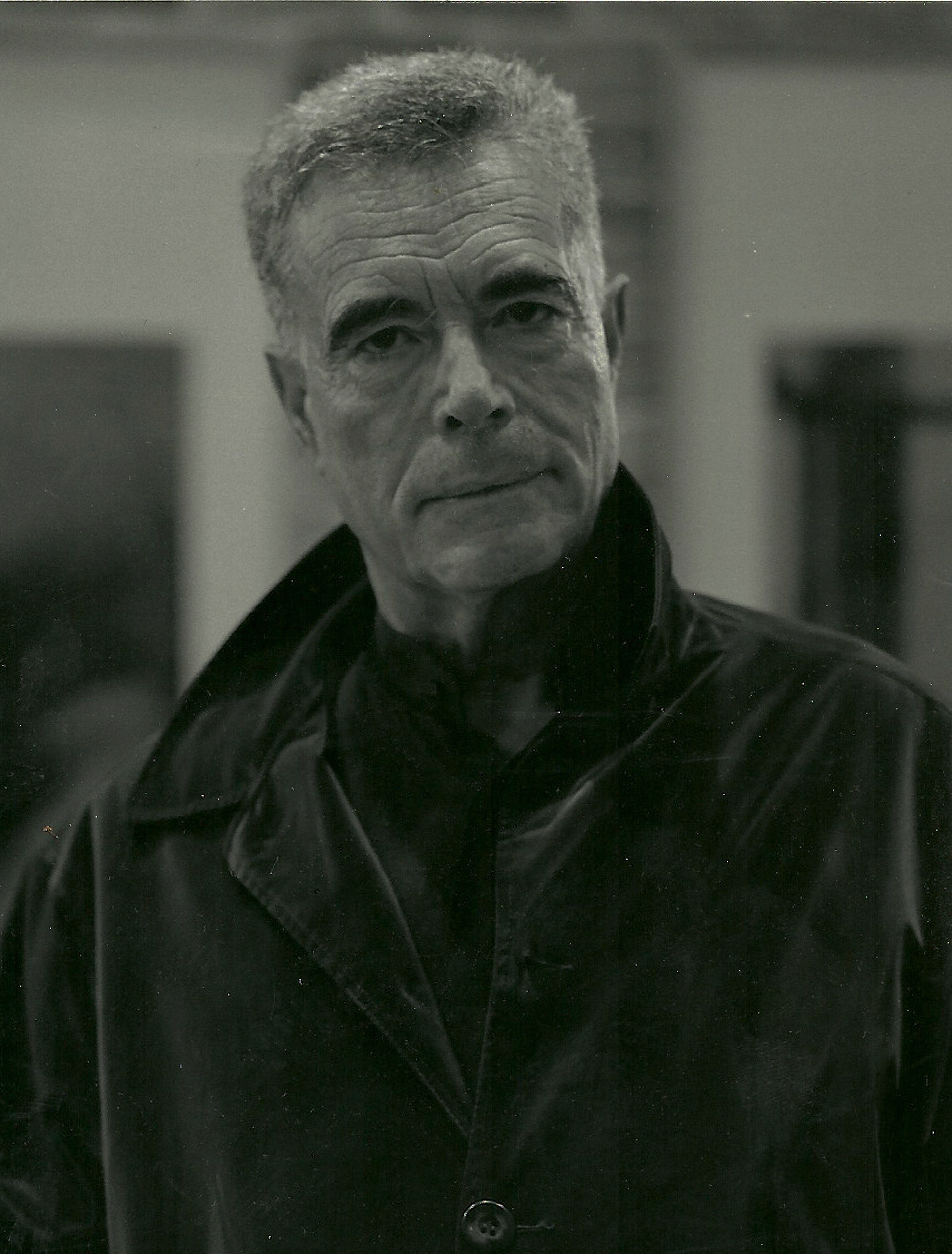
- Costa in 2013
- Born: 25 January 1940; Peniche, Portugal
- Died: 8 July 2021 (aged 81)
- Occupation: Film director

Ricardo Costa (25 January 1940 – 8 July 2021) was a Portuguese film director. He wrote texts on cinema, vision, and language.

== Works ==
Costa's works were primarily composed of documentaries, many of them containing elements of fiction. He used direct cinema as a tool for salvage ethnography. His film, Mists, was displayed at the 60th Venice International Film Festival in 2003. It was released at the Quad Cinema in New York City in April 2011. His film, Drifts, was released in 2016, followed by Cliffs in 2017.

== Biography ==
Costa studied at the University of Lisbon, where he obtained a doctorate in literature in 1969 after defending a thesis on the works of Franz Kafka. He worked as a high school teacher and editor of sociological books. Following the Carnation Revolution, he became a professional film director and producer. He was a partner in the GRUPO ZERO alongside João César Monteiro, Jorge Silva Melo, Alberto Seixas Santos, and others. The group organized cinematic screenings in Paris at the Cinémathèque Française.

=== Death ===
Ricardo Costa died on 8 July 2021 at the age of 81.

== Writings ==
=== Articles ===
==== In Portuguese ====
- "O olhar antes do cinema" (1982)
- "A outra face do espelho" (2000)
- "Jean Rouch do avesso" (2017)

==== In English ====
- "Having to create" (2019)
- "Having to be" (2019)
- "Having to see" (2019)
- "Having to do" (2020)
- "Lecture"

=== Essays ===
==== In Portuguese ====
- Os olhos e o cinema (1997)
- Olhos no ecrã (2000)
- Os olhos da ideia (2002)

==== In English ====
- Happiness from the past to the future (2020)

== Filmography ==
=== Feature films ===
- As Armas e o Povo (1975)
- Avieiros (1975)
- Mau Tempo, Marés e Mudança (1976)
- Abril no Minho (1978)
- Castro Laboreiro (1979)
- Pitões, Aldeia do Barroso (1979)
- Verde por Fora, Vermelho por Dentro (1980)
- Longe É a Cidade (1981)
- Ao Fundo desta Estrada (1981)
- O Pão e o Vinho (1983)
- O Nosso Futebol (1985)
- Paroles (1998)
- Mists (2003)
- Drifts (2016)
- Cliffs (2017)

=== Short and medium-length films ===
- No Fundo de Troia (1974)
- Apanhadores de Algas (1974)
- Agar-Agar (1974)
- Tresmalho (1975)
- O Trol (1975)
- O Arrasto (1975)
- Oceanografia Biológica (1975)
- Ti Zaragata e a Bateira (1975)
- Pesca da Sardinha (1975)
- Conchinha do Mar (1975)
- Às Vezes Custa (1975)
- A Sacada (1975)
- Os Irmãos Severo e os Cem Polvos (1976)
- À Flor do Mar (1976)
- A Colher (1976)
- O Velho e o Novo (1976)
- A Falta e a Fartura (1976)
- Quem só muda de Camisa (1976)
- A Máquina do Dinheiro (1976)
- Viver do Mar (1976)
- Uma Perdiz na Gaiola (1976)
- Nas Voltas do Rio (1976)
- O Submarino de Vidro (1976)
- Cravos de Abril (1976)
- Das Ruínas do Império (1977)
- E do Mar Nasceu (1977)
- Música do Quotidiano (1978)
- Abril no Minn (1978)
- A Lampreia (1979)
- A Coca (1979)
- Histórias de Baçal (1979)
- Esta aldeia, Rio de Onor (1979)
- O Pisão (1979)
- A Feira (1979)
- O Outro Jogo (1979)
- Joaquim da Loiça (1980)
- Pastores da Serra da Estrela (1980)
- Barcos de Peniche (1980)
- O Parque Nacional de Montesinho (1980)
- Lisboa e o Mar (1982)
- GIG (2014)

== External sources ==
- Ricardo Costa at IMDb
