= God's Comedy =

A Comédia de Deus
- Portuguese DVD cover
- Portuguese: A Comédia de Deus
- Directed by: João César Monteiro
- Written by: João César Monteiro
- Based on: Um mover de olhos brando e piadoso by Luís Vaz de Camões
- Produced by: Joaquim Pinto
- Starring: Cláudia Teixeira; João César Monteiro; Manuela de Freitas
- Cinematography: Mário Barroso
- Edited by: Carla Bogalheiro
- Production companies: G.E.R. (Grupo de Estudos e Realizações); Pierre Grise Productions; Zentropa Productions; Mikado Film; La Sept/Arte
- Distributed by: Madragoa Filmes (Portugal)
- Release dates: September 1995 (Venice); January 19, 1996 (Portugal)
- Running time: 165 minutes
- Countries: Portugal; France; Italy; Denmark
- Language: Portuguese

God's Comedy (Portuguese: A Comédia de Deus) is a 1995 comedy-drama film written, directed and starring João César Monteiro. It is the second entry in an informal trilogy, preceded by Recollections of the Yellow House (1989) and followed by As Bodas de Deus (1999). God is symbolized through the character João de Deus (lit.: John of God), played by Monteiro himself.

The film had its world premiere at the main competition of the 52nd Venice International Film Festival in September 1995, where it won the Grand Special Jury Prize. It was theatrically released in Portugal on 19 January 1996.

The film was submitted as the Portuguese entry for the Best Foreign Language Film at the 68th Academy Awards, but was not nominated.

== Premise ==
Haunted by memories, having left the asylum, João de Deus prospered, becoming responsible for the Ice Cream Paradise and even inventing the store's specialty. He spends his free time at home, alone, with a collection of female pubic hairs, which he jealously guards in a Book of Thoughts. The owner of the Paradise, Judite, aims to expand the business to a French counterpart, counting on a delicacy from her protégé to convince the potential Parisian partner. But things go wrong, while God's own behavior begins to deteriorate into a sickly insanity. The closest cause is Joaninha, the daughter of the neighborhood's stern butcher.

== Cast ==
- João César Monteiro as João de Deus (lit.: John of God)
- Cláudia Teixeira as Joaninha
- Manuela de Freitas as Judite
- Raquel Ascensão as Rosarinho
- Rui Luís as Talhante
- Glicínia Quartin as Dona Antónia
- Mário Barroso as Pedro Cruel
- Gracinda Nave as Felícia
- Patrícia Abreu as Alexandra
- Maria Ribeiro as Carmen
- Bruno de Sousa as Bruno
- André Gago as Romão
- João Pedro Gil as God's voice

== Release ==
The film had its world premiere at the main competition of the 52nd Venice International Film Festival in September 1995, where it won the Grand Special Jury Prize. It was theatrically released in Portugal on 19 January 1996.

The film was submitted as the Portuguese entry for the Best Foreign Language Film at the 68th Academy Awards, but was not nominated.

== See also ==
- List of submissions to the 68th Academy Awards for Best Foreign Language Film
- List of Portuguese submissions for the Academy Award for Best Foreign Language Film
