= Jeanne Waltz =

Swiss filmmaker (born 1962)

- Born: Jeanne Hélène Emmanuelle Waltz; August 12, 1962 (age 64); Basel, Switzerland
- Education: Free University of Berlin
- Occupations: Film Director, Writer, Animation specialist
- Awards: 2008 Swiss Film Prize for the best screenplay

Jeanne Hélène Emmanuelle Waltz (born 1962) is a Swiss filmmaker. She lives in Portugal, where she works as a film director, screenwriter, and set designer.

== Early life ==
Waltz was born in Basel in Switzerland on 12 August 1962. She began to study Japanese at the Free University of Berlin in 1981, graduating in 1986, and then ran a small cinema, a small concert club and a film club in Berlin until 1988.

== Career ==
While working for the Berlinale in 1988, she met the Portuguese director and sound engineer Joaquim Pinto. He told her about his desire to open his own small cinema in Lisbon and persuaded her to go to Portugal in 1989 to manage the cinema. After the cinema project failed, she began working for Portuguese film productions. She first worked as a driver in 1989 for the film Recollections of the Yellow House, directed by João César Monteiro and produced by Pinto. Since there was no lack of drivers, but a shortage of people to assist with stage design, she also worked on that. She then moved on to other productions, including for Manoel de Oliveira with No, or the Vain Glory of Command, Wim Wenders' Until the End of the World and Manuel Mozo's Xavier. She also worked in Germany for Tom Tykwer's Deadly Maria.

After turning more to writing, she first wrote the screenplay for Joaquim Pinto's Das Tripas Coração (1992), which was then followed by other screenplays for other Portuguese directors. She also wrote the scripts for her own films. Her short films O Que Te Quero (What I want from you - 1998) and As Terças da Bailarina Gorda (Fat Ballerina Tuesdays - 2000) were particularly well received by critics. Her first feature film as a director was Daqui p'ra alegria (From here to Joy - 2004), which was followed by her French-Swiss production Pas Douce (The Parting Shot - 2007), which won the 2008 Swiss Film Prize for the best screenplay. Her work has also been shown at several film festivals, such as at Locarno and the Berlinale.

While continuing to make films, in 2020 Waltz received a master's degree in animation art from Lisbon's Universidade Lusófona, with a short film Nós os Lentos (We, the Slow). She also teaches film at the École cantonale d'art de Lausanne (ECAL) in Lausanne, Switzerland.

== Awards ==
- O Que Te Quero (1998)
  - Caminhos do Cinema Português, Coimbra 1998 (Best short film)
  - Berlinale 1998 (Nominated for best short film)
- As Terças da Bailarina Gorda (2000)
  - Torino Film Festival (Nominated for best short film)
- Daqui p'ra alegria (2004)
  - Caminhos do Cinema Português, Coimbra 2004 (Price for best new discovery)
  - Festival del Cinema Europeo, Lecce (Nominated for a Golden Olive)
- Pas Douce (2007):
  - Swiss Film Award 2008 (Best screenplay; nominated for best film)
  - IndieLisboa, Lisbon 2007 (Distributors’ Prize)
  - Tallinn Black Nights Film Festival (Nominated for the Grand Prize)

== Filmography ==
=== Director ===
- 1995: The Incubator (Short film, also screenplay)
- 1997: Morte Macaca (Short film, also screenplay)
- 1998: O Que Te Quero (Short film, also screenplay, camera and editing)
- 1999: La reine du coq-à-l'âne (Short film, also camera)
- 2000: As Terças da Bailarina Gorda (Short film, also screenplay and editing)
- 2004: Daqui p'ra alegria (also screenplay and editing)
- 2007: Pas Douce (also screenplay)
- 2007: Agora Tu (Short film, also screenplay)
- 2010: Todos Iguais a Dormir (Short film, also screenplay)
- 2017: Lucília (Short film, also screenplay)
- 2020: Nós os Lentos (Short film, also screenplay)
- 2021: Contágio (Short film)
- 2023: O Vento Assobiando nas Gruas

=== Screenplay ===
- 1992: Das Tripas Coração; Director: Joaquim Pinto
- 1999: ...Quando Troveja; Director: Manuel Mozos
- 2000: A Raiz do Coração; Director: Paulo Rocha
- 2000: Peixe-Lua; Director: José Álvaro Morais
- 2002: Low-Flying Aircraft; Director: Solveig Nordlund
- 2003: Quaresma; Director: José Álvaro Morais
- 2009: Águas Mil; Director: Ivo Ferreira
