= Dalila Rocha =

Portuguese actress (1920–2009)

- Born: 24 August 1920; Peso da Régua, Portugal
- Died: 28 July 2009 (aged 88); Porto, Portugal
- Known for: Stage and television acting

Dalila Ferreira de Sousa Rocha (24 August 1920 – 28 July 2009) was a Portuguese stage and television actress who was closely associated with the Experimental Theatre of Porto (Teatro Experimental do Porto – TEP) and the Teatro da Cornucópia in Lisbon.

== Early life ==
Rocha was born in the municipality of Peso da Régua on 24 August 1920, the daughter of Manuel Ferreira and Alice dos Anjos. Her mother was a teacher, who was subsequently assigned to a primary school in Vila Nova de Gaia on the left bank of the Douro river, opposite Porto on the other bank. Rocha attended the Carolina Michaëlis High School in Porto. At the age of twenty, she started to work at the Post Office in Porto, as a telephone operator, staying there until she became a professional actress in 1957. Interested in cultural and political issues, she joined the Movement of Democratic Unity, a grouping that opposed the authoritarian Estado Novo regime of the time.

== Career ==
In the early 1950s, she became involved in Porto's cultural life and joined a group of amateur actors that became the Experimental Theatre of Porto. On 18 June 1953, she participated in the first performance by TEP, under the direction of António Pedro. Three plays were performed that evening and she was in two of them. TEP is credited with introducing the concept of modern theatrical staging in Portugal and is the oldest Portuguese theatre group in existence. Between 1953 and 1963, first as an amateur (1953–1957), then as a professional after TEP became a professional theatre group, she was the leading actress for the company, playing roles such as Linda Loman in Arthur Miller's Death of a Salesman, which was also TEP’s first performance outside Porto, in Lisbon; Lady Macbeth in William Shakespeare's Macbeth; Mary Cavan Tyrone in Long Day's Journey into Night by Eugene O'Neill, and Temple Drake in The Requiem by William Faulkner, as well as leading roles in important plays by Portuguese playwrights, often performing alongside the actor João Guedes. Pedro resigned as director in 1961, but Rocha continued to work with the company until January 1964 when, after disagreements with the management, she decided to leave. During that time, she also did some television work in the series Madame Lambrós (1961); When the Sea Overcame the Land (1961); Volpone (1962); The Sailor (1962); The Devil Went to the Nests (1963); and Hope and Destiny (1963).

She was then invited to go to Lisbon to join the company of Amélia Rey Colaço, which was performing at the D. Maria II National Theatre. It appears that she had difficulties taking up the position as the regime considered her to be too left wing. But, in December of 1964, a fire broke out at the theatre, and the company of Colaço lost all its sets, costumes, and props. It struggled on while facing censorship from the Estado Novo, moving to the Teatro Avenida, only for that theatre to burn down in 1967. So, little is known about Rocha’s theatrical work from 1964 until 1973, but she did work on several TV series, including Theatre Behind the Scenes (1964); Incomplete Symphony (1965); The Fishing Rod (1965); The Two Faces of Love (1967); What is a Man Worth (1967); The Second Wall (1967); To Each His Own Truth (1968); The Holy Family (1972); Gentle Manners (1975); And Can't You Exterminate Him? (1979); and Fragments of a Doctor's Way (1980).

In 1973, Jorge Silva Melo founded the Teatro da Cornucópia theatre company with Luís Miguel Cintra. The company's first performance was The Misanthrope by Molière, in the Teatro Laura Alves in Lisbon. Rocha starred in the play together with Glicínia Quartin, Raquel Maria, and Filipe La Féria. She continued to work with the Cornucópia, on television and in one or two films, including Brandos Costumes, although she was restricted in what she could do by her the illness of her partner, Mário Bonito. After another break for family reasons, she returned to the Cornucópia in the 1980s, participating in six plays. But, in 1985, after playing the Duchess of York in Shakespeare's Richard III she decided to retire and return to Porto, where she chose to stay out of the public eye.

== Honours and awards ==
Rocha received an award from the Festival Internacional de Teatro de Expressão Ibérica (FITEI) in 1990. She was made an Honorary Member of TEP in 1996 and in 1998 was honoured at the Teatro Sá da Bandeira in Porto, when TEP celebrated its 45th anniversary and a book of tributes to her was launched with contributions from about 50 people. She was awarded the Municipal Medal of Merit – Gold Grade, by Porto City Council in 2004, on the same day that TEP received the same award. She was a recipient of the Almada Theatre Festival award in 2005.

== Death ==
Rocha died on 28 July 2009 in Porto. She was buried at the Cemetery of Prado do Repouso.
