= Low-flying aircraft =

Low-flying aircraft may mean:

- Low flying military training
- Nap-of-the-earth, a low-altitude flight used by military aircraft to avoid enemy detection and attack
- Aircraft flying near an airport:
  - Takeoff
  - Landing
- Aircraft flying below the allowed minimum height for the type within an aviation authority's jurisdiction, such as

- Hang-gliders
- Microlights
- Drone (aircraft)
- Balloon (aeronautics)
- Search and rescue aircraft

== In the arts ==
- Low-Flying Aircraft and Other Stories, a book by J. G Ballard
- Low-Flying Aircraft (film), a Portuguese film originally titled Aparelho Voador a Baixa Altitude

== See also ==
- Ceiling (aircraft)
- Altitude § Altitude in aviation
