= Raquel Maria =

Portuguese actress and artist

- Born: Raquel Maria Cabrita dos Santos; 18 May 1946; Castro Verde, Portugal
- Died: 26 July 2006 Aged 60; Lisbon,
- Occupations: Stage, television and film acting

Raquel Maria Cabrita dos Santos (1946 —2006), better known as Raquel Maria, was a Portuguese stage, television and film actress.

== Early life ==
Raquel Maria was born in Castro Verde in the Alentejo region of Portugal on 18 May 1946. Her father was a barber and her mother a maid. They moved to Barreiro, just south of the Portuguese capital of Lisbon in the Setúbal District, where she went to primary school. She had wanted to become an artist but had been unable to register in a school for lack of funds. Instead, she registered with the Cooperative of Portuguese Engravers in Lisbon, where she learned the techniques of drawing, engraving and serigraphy, studying outside working hours while working as a secretary.

== Career ==
A successful actress in amateur theatre, playing at the Sociedade Recreativa 22 de Novembro of Barreiro, Maria received training at the Instituto Italiano de Cultura (Italian Cultural Institute) in Lisbon. Her debut was in The Mousetrap by Agatha Christie, but it was her performance in the play John Gabriel Borkman by Henrik Ibsen, which won several awards and was shown on television, that attracted the attention of Luís Miguel Cintra and Jorge Silva Melo who, in 1973, invited her to join the founding nucleus of Teatro da Cornucópia theatre group in Lisbon, where she would perform almost thirty plays by writers such as Dario Fo and August Strindberg, debuting in The Misanthrope by Molière. She played many different types of roles, but was best known for being a comic actress. In 1986 she received the Best Actress Award from the Portuguese Association of Theatre Critics for her performance in Strindberg's Easter. Leaving the Cornucópia in 1987, she moved to the Centro Cultural da Malaposta (Malaposta Cultural Centre) in Odivelas, Lisbon. Maria left the Malaposta in 1992 and only appeared on one more occasion on the stage, during the 1998 Lisbon World Exposition.

Maria first appeared on television in 1981, with this leading to regular appearances in the 1980s and 1990s, when she began to appear in sitcoms. Her performances on television brought her closer to the general public, particularly with appearances in humorous series such as Os Malucos do Riso, Bora Lá, Marina and Aventuras de Camilo. She made her film debut in 1982, and made a total of 13 film appearances.

In private, she returned to her first love of art, devoting herself to painting and engraving. She participated in several engraving exhibitions, being awarded a bronze medal in 1982.

== Death ==
Maria died on 26 July 2006 from pancreatic cancer.

== Films ==
Maria's films were:

- A Vida É Bela?! by Luís Galvão Teles (1981);
- Silvestre by João César Monteiro (1981);
- Paisagem sem Barcos by Lauro António (1983);
- Os Abismos da Meia-Noite by António de Macedo (1983);
- O Bobo by José Álvaro de Morais (1987);
- A Maldição de Marialva by António de Macedo (1990);
- O Rapaz do Tambor by Vítor Silva (1990);
- Rosa Negra by Margarida Gil (1992);
- Terra Fria by António Campos (1992);
- A Sombra dos Abutres by Leonel Vieira (1998);
- Golpe de Asa by António Borges Correia (1999);
- Mal by Alberto Seixas Santos (1999);
- Um Tiro no Escuro by Leonel Vieira (2005).
