= Sophia de Mello Breyner Andresen (film) =

- Directed by: João César Monteiro
- Written by: João César Monteiro
- Produced by: Ricardo Malheiro
- Cinematography: Abel Escoto
- Edited by: João César Monteiro
- Music by: Bach
- Release date: 1969
- Running time: 17 minutes
- Country: Portugal
- Language: Portuguese

Sophia de Mello Breyner Andresen is a black-and-white 1969 Portuguese documentary film by João César Monteiro, then using the name João César Santos, about the notable poet. It was Monteiro's first completed film. It is dedicated to the memory of Carl Theodor Dreyer.

Sophia de Mello Breyner Andresen is part of a series of short films dedicated to relevant personalities of Portuguese arts and literature produced by the company Cultura Filmes (1967–69) with support from the Gulbenkian Foundation. Monteiro, at the time with no references besides having frequented the London School of Film Technique (1963–65), was recommended to Ricardo Malheiro (1909–77), the owner of Cultura Filmes and himself a director of documentary shorts, by Alberto Seixas Santos and António Pedro Vasconcelos. Initially, Monteiro was developing a project on 19th-century novelist Camilo Castelo Branco to be named Como Filmar Camilo? (How to Film Camilo?). The choice of the Gulbenkian Foundation to confine the series to living personalities made him turn to Sophia.

The work opens with Monteiro reading the credits in voice-over. The poet is filmed among her children in the Algarve during the summer. An important source of inspiration to Sophia herself, the luminous region where Monteiro would shoot Hovering Over the Water (1986) is one of the essential matters of the film. The sea is its dominant element. Sophia de Mello Breyner Andresen ends with the poet writing her name in a sheet that fades to white under the sound of the waves.

Of his own films, Sophia de Mello Breyner Andresen was probably the one more openly discussed by Monteiro. In a self-interview he wrote:

… I suppose, first of all, that it is the proof for those willing to understand that poetry is not filmable and there is no point in pursuing it. What is filmable is always something else that may or may not have a poetic quality. My film is the realization of this impossibility, and this uncompromising shame makes it, I believe, poetic, malgré-lui. I also believe … that much more than a movie about Sophia, who for me only in a random way is part of it, my film is a film about cinema and its matter.
