= Sinan Savaskan =

British composer

Sinan Carter Savaşkan (born 11 August 1954) is a Turkish-born, British composer of contemporary classical music. He works and lives in London, England, where he is the Composer in Residence for the Octandre Ensemble and an executive committee member of the British Academy of Songwriters, Composers and Authors.

Savaskan's music has been programmed widely by organisations and ensembles such as the ICA (Institute of Contemporary Arts) in London — in particular, its MusICA series run for many years by Adrian Jack—the BBC, Lontano, the Balanescu Quartet, the Smith Quartet, the S.E.M. Ensemble of New York, and such conductors as Martyn Brabbins, Zsolt Nagy and Petr Kotik.

== Music career ==
Savaşkan's music employs highly personal pitch-time structuring methods, derived from notions of spatial perspective and architecture. This pitch-time technique was first displayed in his chamber works Many Stares Through Semi-Nocturnal Zeiss Blink (1979) and Antedonia (1980). The basis of the technique is the gradual circular rotation of pitch classes moving at different speeds simultaneously; this rotation can be effected chromatically, micro-chromatically, through glissandi, or any combination of these. Since each rotating pitch class may also be transposed through octave displacement, the resultant harmonic implications of three or more parts rotating in different directions at separate speeds can be quite complex and rich. "Nodal" points are reached when two or more parts reach either unison, an octave, or some other simple consonance such as a perfect fifth, and these lend his music a clear sense of cadence at structural points. In some pieces, such as the string quartet Speed/1969 (1986) the natural overtones of a rotating pitch may also be incorporated into the work's harmony. In others, such as the saxophone quartet The Street (1982), the pitch construction may incorporate elements from pre-existent popular or traditional music.

Savaskan's first mature works were relatively strict in their applications of his pitch-time structuring methods. Since 1986, however, his music has exhibited greater diversity, whilst not abandoning the conscientious structuring of earlier works (to this day, he remains a committed Constructivist). The first piece to demonstrate this new direction was "Panic in Needle Park", for string quartet and electronics, which is rhythmically propulsive and melodically more direct than anything he had previously composed. Savaskan's Second Symphony, Age of Analysis (1997–98), premiered by the BBC Symphony Orchestra for BBC Radio 3, is another work of this type. This work proceeds from a relatively neutral starting point of gradual harmonic change to a tumultuous finale in which elements of traditional dance rhythms and other extraneous melodic-harmonic elements are integrated into a continuously evolving form. As Savaskan's harmonic method arrives at a concluding nodal point, the music ends with a cadence in the home pitch class, E. There have been other symphonies since then, and a chamber work "Unique strands, circular functions and Portofino", which premiered in London in 2001.

Savaskan was a member of the London Musicians Collective, and was the composer of the title track of the organisation's first recording in 1981.

In May 2002, BBC Radio 3 "Between the Ears" programme featured Sinan Savaskan and his Symphony No. 3 La Rosa Enflorece and the English Cadence in a programme entitled "The Rise and Fall of The English Cadence" presented by Jeremy Summerly and produced by Antony Pitts.

In October 2007, BBC Radio 3 celebrated its 40th year. Savaskan's Second Symphony, The Age of Analysis, was featured as one of the ten most memorable pieces on Hear and Now's "40 Years of Radio 3: Two Programmes Marking 40 Years of Radio 3 and Its Relationship with New Classical Music".

Until 2019, Savaskan was Head of Department for Academic Music at Westminster School, where he instituted a new music programme and taught many composers and instrumentalists in modern classical concert music who now follow successful careers, including Christian Mason, Alexander Ho, Alexander Shelley, Alexander Campkin, Edmund Jolliffe; and a number who moved into the popular music sphere (including Mika, Dido, Grace Chatto and Neil Amin-Smith of Clean Bandit, and Sub Focus).

=== Honours ===
Savaskan won the 1988 Dio Fund Award of Arts Council of Great Britain for Composition with his quartet for saxophones, The Street, originally commissioned and premiered by John Harle with his Myrha Saxophone Quartet.

Savaskan received a 1998 Foundation for Contemporary Arts Grants to Artists Award.

The BBC selected this work as one of its entries in the 1999 Unesco International Rostrum of Composers.

In December 2015, he won the prestigious British Composer Award, organised by the British Academy of Composers, Songwriters and Authors and BBC Radio 3. Module 60 of his epic cycle Many Stares Through Semi-Nocturnal Zeiss-Blink was selected by the jury as the winner of the Large Chamber Music category. In August 2020, he received a major grant from the PRSF (Performing Right Society Foundation, UK to write a major work to be recorded and published by the Métier Recordings).

== Theatrical work ==
Sinan Savaskan was the music director and Composer for Oedipus Rex, University of Cambridge's triennial production performed entirely in classical Greek at Performances at Arts Theatre, Cambridge, 11–16 October 2004; featuring a production team including Director Annie Castledine and Royal National Theatre's Designer Stephen Brimson-Lewis. The event is held once every three years as the Cambridge Greek Play and is a tradition which started in 1882, often involving music commissioned by well-known composers of the day: R. Vaughan Williams, Parry, Wood, Stanford among them.

His other music for the theatre in recent years includes Aristophanes' Lysistrata, The Birds, and The Frogs; Euripides' The Trojan Women; Sophocles' Philoctetes and Oedipus at Colonus; Plautus' The Rope; Molière's The Miser; Shakespeare's Pericles; Claudel's Partage de Midi; and Terence's Phormio and Adelphoe.

== Film scores ==
In the early 2000s, he acted as musical director for a film-in-production on the life of the Renaissance composer Gesualdo, directed by Bernardo Bertolucci, produced by Jeremy Thomas with a screenplay by the Oscar-winning writer Mark Peploe.

In 2013, Savaskan composed the original score for the Portuguese-British feature film co-production The Invisible Life, directed by Vítor Gonçalves, which had its world premiere at the international competition of the 2013 Rome Film Festival.

== Personal life ==
He is a member of the executive committee of the British Academy of Songwriters, Composers and Authors, and a composer member of the PRS/MCPS, London.

He holds a Doctorate from the University of York, UK.
