= The Invisible Life =

- Directed by: Vítor Gonçalves
- Written by: Vítor Gonçalves; Mónica Santana Baptista; Jorge Braz Santos
- Produced by: Pedro Fernandes Duarte; Rui Alexandre Santos; Christopher Young; Maria João Sigalho
- Starring: Filipe Duarte; Maria João Pinho; João Perry; Susana Arrais; Pedro Lamares
- Cinematography: Leonardo Simões
- Edited by: Rodrigo Rodrigues Pereira; Rui Alexandre Santos
- Music by: Sinan Savaskan
- Production companies: Rosa Filmes; Young Films
- Release date: 1 August 2013
- Running time: 99 minutes
- Countries: Portugal; United Kingdom; Andorra
- Language: Portuguese
- Budget: €800,000

The Invisible Life (Portuguese: A Vida Invisível) is a Portuguese feature-length drama film directed by Vítor Gonçalves and produced by the Portuguese production company Rosa Filmes.

The film's world premiere was at the international competition of the 2013 Rome Film Festival.

== Plot ==
The film follows the interior life of Hugo, a middle-aged public servant who lives by night at his workplace, the palace of Terreiro do Paço in Lisbon from where centuries before the Portuguese Empire was governed, nowadays ministries of the Portuguese government. Obsessed with the 8mm footage he discovered at the belongings of António, his recently deceased superior, Hugo recalls the day António told him he was dying. These memories unexpectedly bring back others, including remembrances of the last time Hugo saw Adriana, the last woman he loved, who is nowadays living in another country.

== Cast ==
- Filipe Duarte as Hugo
- Maria João Pinho as Adriana
- João Perry as António
- Pedro Lamares as Sandro
- Susana Arrais as the nurse

== Production ==
The film marks Vítor Gonçalves return to feature filmmaking after a hiatus of more than twenty years following his acclaimed debut with the cult-film A Girl In Summer.

== Reception ==
The Guardian's Andrew Pulver awarded the film four stars, describing it as "rigorous, elegant study of emotional crisis." Sukhdev Sandhu, writing in Sight & Sound, said the film "asks raw, unsettling questions of us all."

CinEuphoria Awards 2015 gave seven awards to the production for Best Actor: Filipe Duarte, Best Film (National Competition), Best Script, Best Supporting Actor: João Perry, Best Original Music: Sinan C. Savaskan, Best Trailer, and Top Ten of the Year https://www.imdb.com/event/ev0002264/2015/1/
