= Agosto (film) =

1987 film

- Directed by: Jorge Silva Melo
- Written by: Philippe Arnaud, Jorge Silva Melo
- Release date: 1987
- Running time: 90 minutes
- Country: France
- Language: French

Agosto is a 1987 French drama film directed by Jorge Silva Melo.

== Cast ==
- Agostinho Alves
- Alice Aurélio
- Norberto Barroca ... Dário (voice)
- Rita Blanco
- José Mário Branco
- Ana Bustorff
- António Capelo
- Marie Carré
- Sérgio Costa Andrade
- Olivier Cruveiller
- Manuela de Freitas
- Diogo Dória
- Luís Fraga
- José Pedro Gomes ... Carlos (voice)
- Egito Gonçalves
- Pedro Hestnes
- Alexandra Lencastre ... Alda (voice)
- Rui Madeira
- José Manuel Mendes
- Fernando Mora Ramos
- José Nascimento
- Vítor Norte
- Christian Patey
- Ângela Peixoto
- Silvina Pereira
- Erica Porru
- Glicínia Quartin
- Isabel Ruth
- Luís Santos
