= Hovering Over the Water =

1986 Portuguese avant-garde arthouse romantic drama film

- Directed by: João César Monteiro
- Written by: João César Monteiro
- Produced by: João César Monteiro
- Starring: Laura Morante; Philip J. Spinelli; Manuela de Freitas; Georges Claisse
- Cinematography: Acácio de Almeida
- Release date: October 2, 1986 (Portugal)
- Running time: 143 minutes
- Country: Portugal
- Languages: Portuguese; Italian; English; French

Hovering Over The Water (Portuguese: À Flor do Mar) is a 1986 Portuguese avant-garde arthouse romantic drama film written, directed and produced by João César Monteiro. Starring Laura Morante. It tells the story of Laura, an Italian woman spending her vacation in Portugal when her idyllic hot summer takes an unexpected turn.

== Synopsis ==
Laura Rossellini, a widow from Rome, vacations on the Algarve coast one hot summer. One day while sunbathing, she finds a wounded man named Robert drifting in the surf on a rubber raft. She takes him home, and, after he is revived, learns his story. As they talk, their mutual attraction grows, until a group of armed men suddenly arrive looking for Robert.

== Cast ==
- Laura Morante as Laura Rossellini
- Philip J. Spinelli as Robert Jordan
- Manuela de Freitas as Sara
- Georges Claisse as Antoine
- Teresa Villaverde as Rosa
- Sérgio do Carmo Antunes as Roberto
- Rita Figueiredo as Maria
- Haddy Moss as head terrorist
- Gerd Volkmar as 1st terrorist
- Frederick Ooms as 2nd terrorist
- João César Monteiro as Stavroguine
- Conceição Guerra as Senhora Amélia

== Production ==
The film was shot in various locations in Algarve between September and November 1985.

== Analysis ==
There is a significant number of references to other films and arts, including to the Italian Renaissance painter Piero della Francesca, to Kenji Mizoguchi's film The Crucified Lovers, and to Roberto Rossellini.

== Release ==
The film had a preview screening at the Cinemateca Portuguesa on October 2, 1986 and was only released in theaters ten years later, in 1996.

The film was screened as part of a complete retrospective on João César Monteiro's work by the Museum of Modern Art, in October 2025.

== Reception ==
José Navarro de Andrade wrote a positive review after its premiere in 1996, saying that "never have the yellow of the sandstone, the blue of the sea, and that undeniable light of the Algarve had such a glorious celebration as in Hovering Over the Water".

João Bénard da Costa called the title "beautiful".

=== Awards ===
The film won the Special Jury Prize in 1987 at the Salso Film & TV Festival.
