= Brandos Costumes =

- Directed by: Alberto Seixas Santos
- Written by: Alberto Seixas Santos; Luísa Neto Jorge; Nuno Júdice
- Produced by: Center of Portuguese Cinema; Tóbis Portuguesa
- Starring: Luís Santos; Dalila Rocha; Isabel de Castro; Sofia de Carvalho; Constança Navarro; Cremilde Gil
- Cinematography: Acácio de Almeida
- Edited by: Solveig Nordlund
- Music by: Jorge Peixinho
- Distributed by: Marfilmes
- Release date: September 18, 1975
- Running time: 72 minutes
- Country: Portugal
- Language: Portuguese

Brandos Costumes (1974) is a Portuguese film directed by Alberto Seixas Santos which was a part of the Novo Cinema movement – influenced by the cinematographic neo-realism and specially by the Nouvelle Vague. It was released in 1975, when the political regime portrayed in the film (the Estado Novo) had already been destroyed.

The film was released in Cinema Londres, in Lisbon, on September 18, 1975.

== Overview ==
- Script: Alberto Seixas Santos, Luísa Neto Jorge, Nuno Júdice
- Director: Alberto Seixas Santos
- Production: Centro Português de Cinema (CPC) and Tóbis Portuguesa
- Financed by: Calouste Gulbenkian Foundation
- Shooting dates: March 1972, October 1973, finished in 1974
- Archive footage: Cinemateca Nacional, Emissora Nacional
- Film extracts: A Revolução de Maio, Chaimite
- Format: 35mm
- Genre: fiction (social drama)
- Duration: 72’
- Length: 1978 meters
- Distributor: Marfilmes (currently), Filmes Castello Lopes (on release date)
- Release date: Cinema Londres, in Lisbon, on September 18, 1975
- International English Titles: Gentle Costume, Gentle Morals, Mild Manners

== Synopsis ==
A portrait of the everyday life of a typical middle-class family in parallel with the fall of the Estado Novo, the 48-year dictatorship led by Salazar. The daughters' conflicts and frustrations with their parents, their grandmother and their maid find an obvious echo in the country's collective events. The Carnation Revolution is about to explode.

== Historical context ==
As a rupturing film, Brandos Costumes is less identifiable by the presence of avant-garde aesthetics or an agile plot with a daring structure - not like Belarmino, by Fernando Lopes or O Cerco, by António da Cunha Telles - than by its ideological left-wing posture, taking a portrait of the social classes, and by its social and political sense of critic.

Some characteristics of the new generation films, revolted with the state of things and motivated to denounce the social injustices, are clearly present in Brandos Costumes. The theatrical tone of the representation of this work let it be integrated in the tradition that Manoel de Oliveira (O Passado e o Presente - 1971) explores.

== Cast ==
- Luís Santos (father)
- Dalila Rocha (mother)
- Isabel de Castro (older daughter)
- Sofia de Carvalho (younger daughter)
- Constança Navarro (grandmother)
- Cremilde Gil (servant-maid)

== Crew ==
- Director: Alberto Seixas Santos
- Producers: Henrique Espírito Santo e Jorge Silva Melo
- Cinematographer: Acácio de Almeida
- Image Operator: Francisco Silva
- Image Assistants: Pedro Efe e Octávio Espírito Santo
- Lighting: João de Almeida, Manuel Carlos e Joaquim Alves
- Editing: Solveig Nordlund
- Sound designer: João Diogo
- Music: Jorge Peixinho
- Image Laboratory: Tobis Portuguesa
- Sound Laboratory: Valentim de Carvalho
