= Silvestre (film) =

- Directed by: João César Monteiro
- Written by: João César Monteiro
- Produced by: Paulo Branco
- Starring: Maria de Medeiros
- Cinematography: Acácio de Almeida
- Music by: Teresa Caldas; João César Monteiro; Manuela Viegas
- Release date: 1981
- Language: Portuguese

Silvestre is a 1981 Portuguese drama film directed by João César Monteiro. It was the debut film of Maria de Medeiros.

The film was entered into the main competition at the 38th edition of the Venice Film Festival.

== Plot ==
The film is based in a fusion of the Portuguese version of an Iberian ballad with a Mulan-style plot (because a man from a knightly family is too old to answer the call of his kingdom to go to war, his daughter dresses-up as a man and fights as his son), A donzela guerreira ("The Warrior Maiden"), and a Portuguese Bluebeard or The Robber Bridegroom variant (where the spouse-killing villain has a hand cut off in the first encounter with the leading lady, and then comes back under a respectable identity), A mão do finado ("The Deadman's Hand").

In 15th century Portugal, The daughters of nobleman Don Rodrigo (João Guedes) give shelter to a stranger identifying himself as the pilgrim on the Saint James Way (Luís Miguel Cintra) during their father's absence (despite his warnings for them to open the doors to no one). After that visit leads to the (hinted) rape of her sister (Teresa Madruga), the youngest daughter Sílvia (Maria de Medeiros) severs his hand to save herself from assault, keeping the man's hand as a token, hidden at home.

After their father returns (the sisters hiding what transpired in his absence from him), the engagement of Sílvia to a foppish suitor (Jorge Silva Melo) is celebrated. The ceremony is interrupted by a knight, who asks for Sílvia's hand. Don Rodrigo agrees, if he can kill the dragon Sílvia raised as a pet, which he does (his triumph is shown just in a still tableau showing Sílvia facing the dead dragon and the knight on horse, the knight on horse then advancing some inches before the scene ends; this scene forms the film's poster). Sílvia and her sister Susana go live at the knight's castle, where they discover that he is the pilgrim (actually, a robber gang chief) who took another form to take revenge on them. Susana helps Sílvia escape, and then joins her back at her father's manor.

By now the nobleman had gone missing, kidnapped, and the king (a, mostly voice, cameo by the director João César Monteiro) orders his hosts to march on in the search of Don Rodrigo and the fight against his enemies. Against her sister's warnings, Sílvia poses as a knight called "Silvestre" to save him. During the war, "Silvestre" grows near to her Alferes (a rank equivalent to the ancient French-inspired continental European fourier or the Anglo-Saxon colour sergeant or ensign (Xosé Maria Straviz). After an injury, the Alferes discovers her gender. Despite her father not being found, she returns to female civilian life at court and is now in love with her former host commanding officer. A stranger comes to court, introducing himself as the scion of a long outcast courtly line, Don Raimundo Montenegro, introducing himself as middleman to negotiate Don Rodrigo's release in exchange for "the warrior maiden's" hand in marriage. Sílvia accepts and in the ceremony, again by her father, mid feasting, Susana reveals to Don Raimundo the severed hand, unmasking him as the same (undead entity?) who took the form of the pilgrim and the knight. In trying to attack Sílvia, the Alferes saves her life, allowing them a happy ending in which they walk away from the remainder of the feast participants and walk into some sort of astral plane.

== Cast ==
- Maria de Medeiros as Sílvia / Silvestre
- Teresa Madruga as Susana
- Luís Miguel Cintra as Pilgrim / Knight / D. Raimundo
- Jorge Silva Melo as D. Paio
- João Guedes as D. Rodrigo
- Xosé Maria Straviz as Lt. Alferes
- Ruy Furtado as Matias
- Raquel Maria as Marta
- Cucha Carvalheiro as Elsa
