= Alberto Seixas Santos =

Portuguese film director

- Born: Alberto Jorge Seixas dos Santos; 20 March 1936; Lisbon, Portugal
- Died: 10 December 2016 (aged 80); Lisbon, Portugal
- Occupation: Film director
- Years active: 1967-2012

Alberto Jorge Seixas dos Santos (20 March 1936 – 10 December 2016) was a Portuguese film director.

== Biography ==
Seixas Santos was born on 20 March 1936 in Lisbon, Portugal. Studied Historical-philosophical Sciences in the Faculty of Letters of the University of Lisbon. In 1958, he started to work as a film critic. Studied in Paris, at the Institut des hautes études cinématographiques (IDHEC) in 1962 and, in the next year, at the London Film School.

Seixas Santos, who belongs to a generation of film club lovers, is part of the cinematic movement called Novo Cinema (New Cinema) and started to shoot documentaries - A Arte e o Ofício de Ourives and Indústria Cervejeira em Portugal (1968). In 1970, he was one of the founders of the Portuguese Cinema Center.

Brandos Costumes, his first feature-film, shot between 1972 and 1975 and written together with the writers Luísa Neto Jorge and Nuno Júdice, draws a line between everyday life of a medium bourgeoisie family and the path of the regime of the military coup of the 28 May 1926. This film was selected to the official competition of the Berlin International Film Festival.

Seixas Santos was one of the directors of As Armas e o Povo (1975), directed by a group of film-makers, which portraits the week between the 25 April and the 1 May, 1974. Following the same political line, sign another collective film A Lei da Terra (1976), shown in the Leipzig Film Festival. During the same year, was nominated the president of the Portuguese Film Institute. He was one of the founders of Grupo Zero, an organization which had illustrious members such as João César Monteiro, Jorge Silva Melo, Ricardo Costa, Margarida Gil, Solveig Nordlund and the cinematographer Acácio de Almeida.

Gestos e Fragmentos (1982), approaches the relation between the military forces and power in Portugal, based in the experiences of Otelo Saraiva de Carvalho, in the point of view of the philosopher and writer Eduardo Lourenço and the American director Robert Kramer. This feature-film participated in the Venice Film Festival in the same year.

From 1980 to 2002 he was professor at the Lisbon Theatre and Film School (Escola Superior de Teatro e Cinema) and, since 1985, for some years, head of programs of RTP.

His most recent feature-film, Mal (1999), was presented at the Venice Film Festival. In 2005, finished the short A Rapariga da Mão Morta, premiered in the Festival de Curtas-Metragens de Vila do Conde. He died in Lisbon on 10 December 2016.

== Filmography ==
- A Arte e Ofício de Ourives (1968)
- Indústria Cervejeira em Portugal (1968)
- Brandos Costumes (1975)
- As Armas e o Povo (1975) - collective film
- A Lei da Terra (1977) - collective film by Grupo Zero
- Gestos e Fragmentos (1982)
- Paraíso Perdido (1992-1995)
- Mal (1999)
- A Rapariga da Mão Morta (2005)
- E o tempo passa (2011)

== See also ==
- Cinema of Portugal
- Cinema Novo

== Bibliographic references ==
- (in Portuguese) Dicionário do Cinema Português (1962-1988) by Jorge Leitão Ramos, Editorial Caminho, SA, Lisbon, 1989
- (in Portuguese) O Cais do Olhar by José de Matos-Cruz, Portuguese Cinematheque, 1999
