= Low-Flying Aircraft (film) =

- Directed by: Solveig Nordlund
- Written by: J. G. Ballard (short-story); Solveig Nordlund; Colin Tucker; Jeanne Waltz
- Produced by: François d'Artemare; Maria João Mayer; Solveig Nordlund
- Starring: Miguel Guilherme; Margarida Marinho; Rui Morrison
- Cinematography: Acácio de Almeida
- Music by: Johan Zachrisson
- Production company: Filmes do Tejo
- Release date: 2002
- Countries: Portugal; Sweden
- Language: Portuguese

Low-Flying Aircraft (original title Aparelho Voador a Baixa Altitude, literally "Flying machines at low altitude") is a 2002 Portuguese film from Swedish director Solveig Nordlund. Its main actors are Miguel Guilherme and Margarida Marinho. The film was based on the 1975 short story "Low Flying Aircraft" by J. G. Ballard.

Margarida Marinho's performance was nominated in 2003 for the Golden Globe, Portugal for Best Actress in a Motion Picture.
