= Mammame =

- Film poster
- Directed by: Raúl Ruiz
- Cinematography: Acácio de Almeida
- Edited by: Martine Bouquin
- Music by: Serge Houppin; Henry Torgue
- Release date: 1986
- Running time: 65 minutes
- Country: France
- Language: French

Mammame is a 1986 French dance film directed by Chilean filmmaker Raúl Ruiz based on French choreographer Jean-Claude Gallotta's modern ballet of the same name. Critic Jonathan Rosenbaum argued that it "rivals The Red Shoes as the most intoxicating dance film ever made".
