= Dom Roberto =

- Directed by: Ernesto de Sousa
- Screenplay by: Leão Penedo
- Starring: Raul Solnado; Glicínia Quartin; Nicolau Breyner; Rui Mendes; Luís Cerqueira
- Cinematography: Abel Escoto
- Release date: 30 May 1962 (Portugal)
- Running time: 102 minutes
- Country: Portugal
- Language: Portuguese
- Budget: 900,000$

Dom Roberto is a 1962 Portuguese film directed by Ernesto de Sousa and starring Raul Solnado, Glicínia Quartin and Nicolau Breyner. It was released on 30 May 1962.

== Cast ==
- Raul Solnado
- Glicínia Quartin
- Nicolau Breyner
- Rui Mendes
- Luís Cerqueira
