= Glicínia Quartin =

Portuguese stage, film and television actor

- Born: 19 December 1924; Lisbon, Portugal
- Died: 27 April 2006 (Aged 81); Lisbon, Portugal
- Occupation: Actor
- Years active: 40
- Known for: Lisbon theatre, Portuguese films and Portuguese television
- Parent(s): Deolinda Lopes Vieira and António Pinto Quartin
- Awards: Grand Cross of the Order of Prince Henry; Lucinda Simões Prize

Glicínia Quartin (1924 – 2006) was a Portuguese stage, film and television actor who received several awards for her performances.

== Early life and training ==
Glicínia Vieira Quartin was born on 19 December 1924, in the Portuguese capital of Lisbon. She was the daughter of the radical teacher, freemason and feminist Deolinda Lopes Vieira and of the anarchist intellectual, António Pinto Quartin. At home, she was exposed to the friends of her parents who were journalists, writers, teachers and members of the feminist movement, such as Maria Lamas and Ana de Castro Osório. Quartin married at the age of 21, against her parents' wishes. Initially studying agronomy for a year, she then transferred to the Faculty of Sciences of the University of Lisbon, graduating in 1954 in biological sciences, while also studying nutrition. She then worked as a marine biologist for 7 years, investigating, in part, the overfishing of cod. This took her to Norway, Greenland and Lowestoft in England to work as an intern.

At the same time as she was developing her scientific skills, Quartin began to perform on the stage, making her debut in 1951 with an experimental theatre group. After her film debut, in Dom Roberto directed by Ernesto de Sousa, she decided to become a professional actor. After attending a theatre course at the school of Alessandro Fersen in Rome, Italy, which followed Stanislavski's system, she made her professional debut at the Teatro Experimental do Porto in 1965. She had had several roles in the theatre and on television while still studying, with her first television performance being in 1952.

Quartin later worked with the Teatro Moderno de Lisboa, Teatro Experimental de Cascais, the D. Maria II National Theatre in Lisbon, at the invitation of Amélia Rey Colaço, and at the Teatro da Cornucópia, where she performed in its first play, The Misanthrope by Molière, with Raquel Maria, Dalila Rocha and Filipe La Féria. She performed in plays by a wide range of authors, such as Jean Genet, Pier Paolo Pasolini, August Strindberg, Maxim Gorki, Eça de Queirós, and Samuel Beckett. At the end of 1967, Amélia Rey Colaço, whose company was operating at the Teatro Capitólio, invited her to replace actress Lourdes Norberto in Edward Albee's A Delicate Balance. This proved to be the beginning of a three-year stay with Colaço's company.

Following the Carnation Revolution in April 1974, which overthrew the authoritarian Estado Novo regime in Portugal, censorship came to an end. Quartin performed in Bertolt Brecht's Fear and Misery of the Third Reich in July 1974, the first Brecht play to be performed professionally in Portugal. She continued to act in the theatre until close to her death, having started to rehearse a play in 2005 but then withdrawn due to doctor's orders. She also took part in over 20 films and in television soap operas, including Chuva na Areia (Rain in the sand - 1983) on the national television station RTP, and O Jogo (The game - 2003), on the SIC channel. In the early 1970s she took a course at the National Conservatory of Lisbon, where she ended up being a teacher for many years. She took a course for the preparation of actors at the Calouste Gulbenkian Foundation. She also collaborated with the Ministry of Education, directing plays for children and giving seminars for teachers on educational drama and movement and drama. On the occasion of her 80th birthday, in 2004, a documentary was broadcast, called Conversations with Glicínia, directed by Jorge Silva Melo.

Glicínia Quartin died on 27 April 2006, in Lisbon, aged 81.

== Awards and honours ==
- 1966. Quartin received the Bordalo Prize, as "Actress Revelation" in the Theatre category.
- 1968. For her performance in Happy Days by Samuel Beckett, Quartin was awarded the Lucinda Simões Prize by the Secretary of State for Information and Tourism (SEIT) for "the best female interpreter of the theatre".
- 1972. For her performance in The Maids by Jean Genet, she was again awarded the Lucinda Simões Prize.
- 2004. She was awarded the Grand Cross of the Order of Prince Henry, a Portuguese national award.
- Since 2012, Quartin has been remembered in the toponymy of Lisbon, with "Avenida Glicínia Quartin", located in the Santa Clara parish.
- A plaque with her name is displayed in the D. Maria II National Theatre.
- A room is named after her in the Belém Cultural Center near Lisbon.
