= Acácio de Almeida =

Portuguese cinematographer (born 1938)

- Born: 29 June 1938 (age 88)
- Citizenship: Portugal
- Occupation: Cinematographer

Acácio de Almeida (born 29 June 1938) is a Portuguese cinematographer best known for his work with João César Monteiro, Raúl Ruiz, Alain Tanner, Valeria Sarmiento and Rita Azevedo Gomes. In 2019, de Almeida won the Sophia Award for Best Cinematography for Sérgio Tréfaut's black-and-white film Raiva (2018), which was the most-awarded film at that year's ceremony.

== Filmography ==
- Past and Present (1972)
- Brandos Costumes (1974)
- Trás-os-Montes (1976)
- Veredas (1978)
- Silvestre (1981)
- A Ilha dos Amores (1982)
- Ana (1982)
- City of Pirates (1983)
- In the White City (1983)
- Manoel's Destinies (1984)
- Régime sans pain (1985)
- Treasure Island (1985)
- Mammame (1986)
- A Portuguese Goodbye (1986)
- A Flame in My Heart (1987)
- The Mask (1988)
- O Sangue (1989)
- Etoile (1989)
- Un Asunto Privado (1996)
- The Mutants (1998)
- Mal (1999)
- Love Torn in a Dream (2000)
- Rasganço (2001)
- Aparelho Voador a Baixa Altitude (2002)
- That Day (2003)
- Second Life (2009)
- Paixão (2012)
- Se Eu Fosse Ladrão, Roubava (2013)
- Colo (2017)
- The Black Book of Father Dinis (2018)
