= Mal (film) =

1999 drama film

- Directed by: Alberto Seixas Santos
- Screenplay by: Alberto Seixas Santos
- Starring: Pauline Cadell; Rui Morisson
- Cinematography: Acácio de Almeida
- Edited by: Catarina Ruivo
- Release date: 1999
- Language: Portuguese

Mal (lit. 'Evil') is a 1999 Portuguese drama film written and directed by Alberto Seixas Santos. It premiered into the main competition at the 56th Venice International Film Festival.

== Cast ==
- Pauline Cadell as Cathy
- Rui Morisson as Pedro
- Alexandre Pinto as Daniel
- Alícia Gomes da Costa as the young girl
- Fábio Silva as Daniel's friend
- Luís Lima Barreto as Mr. Cruz
- Maria Santos as Marta
