= Sophia de Mello Breyner Andresen =

Portuguese poet and writer (1919–2004)

Sophia de Mello Breyner Andresen GColSE GCIH
- Andresen, c. 1975
- Born: 6 November 1919; Porto, Portugal
- Died: 2 July 2004 (aged 84); Lisbon, Portugal
- Resting place: National Pantheon
- Occupations: Writer; poet
- Spouse: Francisco Sousa Tavares (m. 1946; div. 1988)
- Children: 5, including Miguel Sousa Tavares
- Writing career
- Period: 1944–2004
- Notable awards: Camões Prize (1999)

Sophia de Mello Breyner Andresen (6 November 1919 – 2 July 2004) was a Portuguese poet and writer. Considered one of the most important Portuguese poets of the 20th century, she published fourteen poetry books between 1944 and 1997, covering themes such as the natural world, the search for justice, Ancient Greece and the importance of poetry. As a novelist, she published several children's books, which she wrote for her own children, mainly in the 1950s and 1960s. She also wrote essays and theatre plays.

Andresen was actively involved in social causes and politics. An opponent of the Estado Novo regime and the Portuguese Colonial War, she was a founder of the National Commission for Support of Political Prisoners. Following the Carnation Revolution, she was a deputy for the Socialist Party in the Constituent Assembly of Portugal, between 1975 and 1976, which created the current Portuguese Constitution.

Andresen was the first Portuguese woman to be awarded the Camões Prize, in 1999. She died in 2004, at the age of 84. Her remains have been entombed in the National Pantheon since 2014.

== Life and career ==
Sophia de Mello Breyner Andresen was born on 6 November 1919 in Porto, Portugal. She was the daughter of Maria Amélia de Mello Breyner and João Henrique Andresen. She had Danish ancestry on her father's side, notably her paternal great-grandfather, Jan Andresen, who had traveled alone to Porto as a boy and never left the region. In 1895, Sophia's grandfather bought Quinta do Campo Alegre, now known as the Porto Botanical Garden, where he raised his family. As stated by Sophia in a 1993 interview, the house and grounds were "a fabulous territory with a large and rich family served by a large household staff."

Her mother, Maria Amélia, was the daughter of Tomás de Mello Breyner, Count of Mafra, a medical doctor of distant Austrian descent and friend of King D. Carlos. Maria Amélia is also the granddaughter of the capitalist Henrique Burnay, from a Belgian family living in Portugal, and future Count of Burnay.

Sophia began her studies at the new Sacred Heart of Jesus College, at 1354 Avenida da Boavista, Porto, entering with the school's first class.

Raised in a mix of bourgeois and old Portuguese aristocracy and educated with traditional Christian morality, she was leader of Catholic university movements while taking classes in Classical Philology at the University of Lisbon (1936–1939), which she never concluded. She collaborated with the magazine "Cadernos de Poesia", where she made friends with influential and well-known authors: Ruy Cinatti and Jorge de Sena. In time, she became one of the most representative figures of a liberal political attitude, supporting the monarchic movement and denouncing Prime minister Salazar's regime and its followers. The song called "Cantata da Paz", became famous as an intervention song of the Progressive Catholics: "We see, hear and read. We cannot ignore!"

In 1946, she married journalist, politician and lawyer Francisco Sousa Tavares (who she would divorce in 1988) and became mother of five children: Isabel, Maria, a university literature professor, Miguel, a journalist and writer, Sofia and Xavier, a painter and ceramist. Her children motivated her to write children's books.

In 1964, Andresen received the Grand Prize of Poetry by the Portuguese Society of Writers for her book Livro Sexto. Following the Carnation Revolution, she was elected to the Constituent Assembly in 1975 by the Porto circle on a Socialist Party list, while her husband joined the Social Democratic Party.

Andersen won acclaim as a storyteller with Contos Exemplares (Exemplary Tales), "Histórias da Terra e do Mar" (Stories of Land and Sea), and a number of children's books – A Menina do Mar (The Sea Girl), O Cavaleiro da Dinamarca (The Danish Knight), A Floresta (The Forest), O Rapaz de Bronze (The Bronze Boy), and A Fada Oriana (The Fairy Oriana). She also published several poetry books and anthologies, including: Poesia, Dual, Livro Sexto, Coral, Dia do Mar, No Tempo Dividido, Grades, O Nome das Coisas, As Ilhas, Antologia, Geografia, Navegações, O Búzio de Cós. In 1999 she became the first woman to receive the highest Portuguese award for poetry, the Prémio Camões (Camões Prize). She was also awarded the Max Jacob Poetry Prize in 2001, and the Spanish Prémio Reina Sofia in 2003.

Besides her work as a writer, she translated Dante and Shakespeare into Portuguese.

=== Later years ===
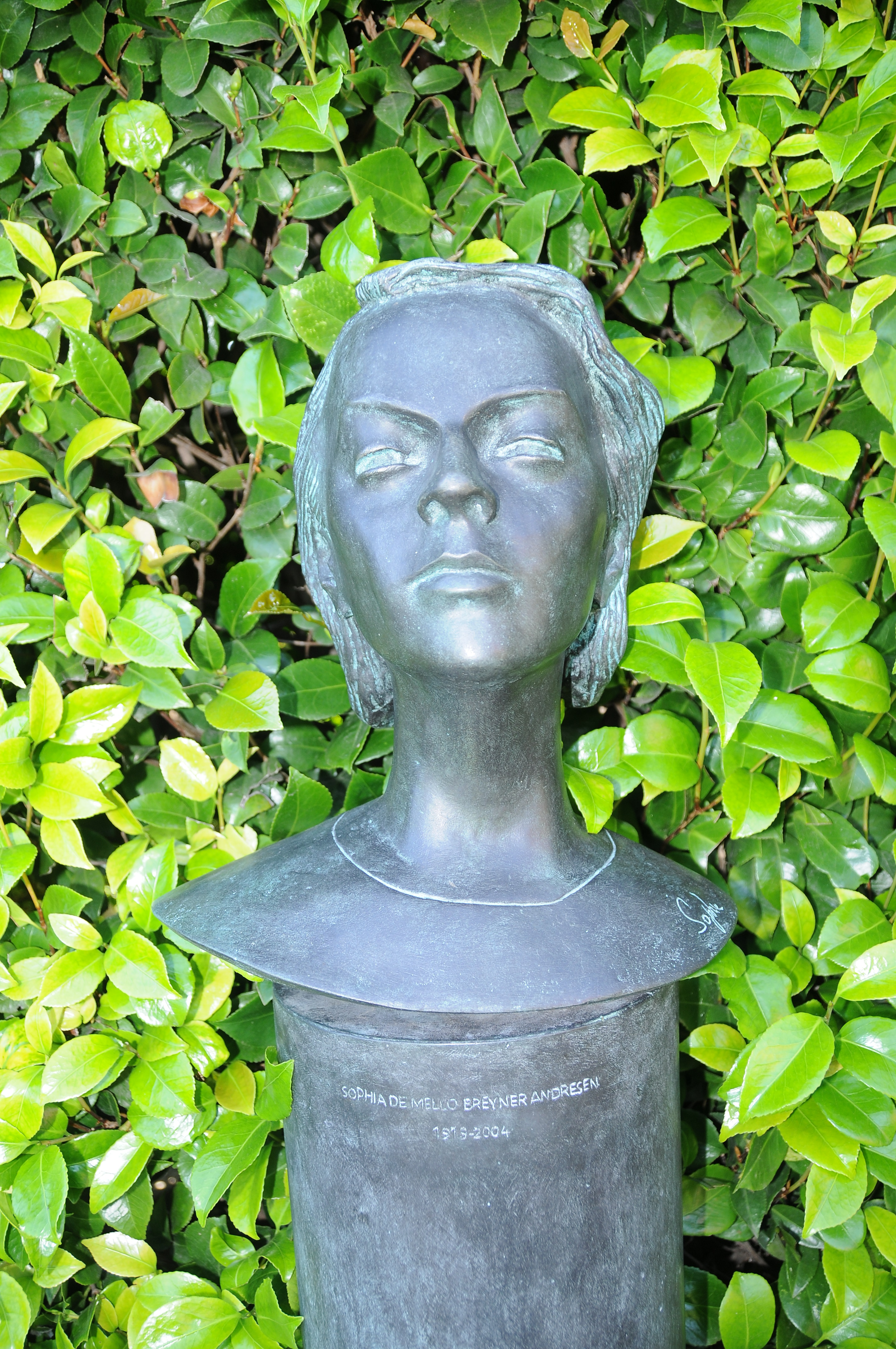
Andresen statue at the Botanical Garden of Porto or House of the Andresen, in Porto, Portugal

Andresen died at the age of 84 on 2 July 2004 in Lisbon, at Pulido Valente Hospital. Initially, her body was buried in Carnide Cemetery, but on 20 February 2014 the Assembly of the Republic unanimously decided to honor the poet by entombing her remains in the Portuguese National Pantheon. The relocation ceremony took place on 2 July 2014.

== Writing style ==
From her childhood and youth, she emphasized the importance of houses, and memories that had a great impact on her work, describing and recalling the houses and the objects inside them. She explained this as follows:

"I have a lot of visual memory and I always remember houses, room by room, furniture by furniture, and I remember many houses that have disappeared from my life... I try to 'represent', I mean, 'bring back the things I liked,' and that's what goes with houses: I want their memory not to drift, not to be lost."

Andresen also believed that poetry had a fundamental transformative value. Her writing corresponded to specific cycles, with the culmination of the activity at night: "I cannot write in the morning,... I need that special concentration that is being created at night." Her nightly experiences are underlined in several poems ("Night", "The Moonlight", "The Garden and the Night", "April Night", and "O Night"). She accepted the notion of inspired poetry, saying that her poetry happened to her, as it did with Fernando Pessoa:

"Fernando Pessoa said: 'A poem has happened to me.' My fundamental writing is very close to this 'happening'. I found poetry before I knew there was literature. I really thought that the poems were not written by anyone, that they existed in themselves, that they were like an element of the natural, that they were suspended immanent. It is difficult to describe the process of writing a poem. There is always a part that I can't distinguish, a part that happens in the area where I don't see it."

According to Dulce Maria Quintela, Andresen's life and memories are an inspiration because she "speaks of herself through her poetry".

=== Early writings ===
Andresen began her love of poetry as a child when, at the age of three, she was taught "A Nau Catrineta" by her nanny Laura.

There was a maid in my house named Laura, whom I liked very much. She was a young, blonde woman, very beautiful. Laura taught me "A Nau Catrineta" because there was an older cousin of mine who had been taught a poem to say at Christmas and she didn't want me to be left behind… I was a phenomenon, reciting the entire "Nau Catrineta". But there are more encounters, fundamental encounters with poetry: the recitation of the "Magnífica" on thunderstorms, for example. When we were a little older, we had a housekeeper who on those nights burned rosemary, lit a candle and prayed. It was a mixed environment of religion and magic… And in a way on those thunderstorms, many things were born. Even a certain social and human concern, or my first awareness of the harshness of the lives of others, because this housekeeper said: "Now fishermen walk in the sea, let us pray that they will reach the land" (...). "

Based on Luísa Pessoa's observations, Andresen focuses on themes such as: childhood and youth, which she uses as a reference space ("The Garden and the House", Poetry, 1944; "House", Geography, 1967; "White House", Poetry, 1944; "Lost Garden", Poetry, Garden and the Night, Poetry, 1944).

=== Later work ===
Contact with nature also profoundly marked her work. For the author, this contact became an example of freedom, beauty, perfection and mystery and is widely found in her work, whether by the allusions to the land (trees, birds, moonlight) or by her references to the sea (beach, shells, waves).

The Sea is one of the key concepts in Andresen's literary creations: "From the Shore / Where It All Started Intact on the First Day of Me." The literary effect of the sea's inspiration can be seen in several poems, such as "Men by the Sea" or "Women by the Sea." The author comments on this inspiration as follows:

"These poems have to do with the Granja mornings, the beach mornings. And also with a painting by Picasso. There is a painting by Picasso called "Women by the Sea." No one will say that Picasso's painting and Lorca's poetry have had a tremendous influence on my poetry, especially in the time of the Choral ... And one of Picasso's influences on me was that I moved the images."

The sea is used to express the obsession with it, its beauty, its serenity and its myths. The sea appears here as a symbol of the dynamics of life. Everything comes from it and everything returns to it. It is the space of life, transformation and death.

The city is another motif often repeated in Andresen's work. The city is viewed as negative space. It represents the cold, artificial, hostile and dehumanized world, the opposite of nature and security.

Another frequently stressed topic in Andresen's work is time: the divided and the absolute that oppose each other. The first is the time of loneliness, fear and lies, while absolute time is eternal, unites life and is the time of moral values. According to Eduardo do Prado Coelho, the divided time is the time of the house's exile, associated with the city, because the city is also made by the twisting of time, the degradation.

Andresen was an admirer of classical literature. In her poems, words often appear of ancient spelling (Eurydice, Delphos, Amphora). The cult for the proper art and tradition of Greek civilization is close to her and shows through her work.

In addition to the thematic aspects mentioned above, Fernando Pessoa's enormous influence on the work of Andresen is also present. What the two authors have in common is: Plato's influence, the appeal to infinity, childhood memory, Sebastianism and Messianism and the formal tone that evokes Álvaro de Campos.

=== Themes ===
In general, the author's thematic universe is comprehensive and can be represented by the following summary points:

- The pursuit of justice, balance, harmony and the demand for morality
- Awareness of the time we live
- Nature and the Sea - euphoric and referential spaces for any human being
- The theme of the house
- Love
- Life as opposed to death
- Childhood memory
- Values of classical antiquity, Hellenic naturalism
- Idealism and individualism at the psychological level
- The poet as shepherd of the absolute
- Christian humanism
- Belief in Messianic and Sebastianist Values
- Separation

Regarding Andresen's language style, the most evident marks are: the hieratic value of the word, the rigorous expression, the appeal to the clarifying vision, richness of symbols and allegories, synesthesias and an evocative rhythm of a ritual dimension. One can also notice a "transparency of the word in its relation of language to things, the luminosity of a world where intellect and rhythm harmonize in perfect, melodic form."

The opinion of her work shared by some of the most important Portuguese literary critics is the same: the author's talent is unanimously appreciated. Eduardo Lourenço says that Andresen has a wisdom "deeper than just knowing", that its intimate knowledge is immense and its reflection, however deep, is exposed in an original simplicity.

== Legacy ==
In the Lisbon Oceanarium, since 2005, some of Andresen's poems with a strong connection to the sea have been placed for permanent reading in the rest areas, allowing visitors to absorb the boldness of her writing while immersed in a deep sea environment.

"Poetry," she explained, "is my understanding of the universe, my way of relating to things, my participation in reality, my encounter with voices and images. This is why a poem speaks not of an ideal life but of a concrete one: the angle of a window, the resonance of streets, cities and rooms, the shadow cast by a wall, a sudden face, the silence, distance and brightness of the stars, the night’s breath, the scent of linden and of oregano." The sea is probably the most central theme in her poetical works. Other recurring themes are Ancient Greece and ideas of freedom and justice.

Her poetry has been translated into English by Ruth Fainlight, Richard Zenith and most recently by Colin Rorrison with Margaret Jull Costa, as well as into many other world languages.

A documentary short film about Andresen was produced in 1969. It was the first completed film by director João César Monteiro (then using the name João César Santos).

== Bibliography ==
=== Poetry ===
- Poesia (1944, Cadernos de Poesia, nº 1, Coimbra; 3.ª ed. 1975)
- O Dia do Mar (1947, Lisbon, Edições Ática; 3.ª ed. 1974)
- Coral (1950, Porto, Livraria Simões Lopes; 2.ª ed., illustrated por Escada, Lisboa, Portugália, 1968)
- No Tempo Dividido (1954, Lisbon, Guimarães Editores)
- Mar Novo (1958, Lisbon, Guimarães Editores)
- Livro Sexto (1962, Lisbon, Livraria Morais Editora; 7.ª ed. 1991)
- O Cristo Cigano (1961, Lisbon, Minotauro, ilustrado por Júlio Pomar)
- Geografia (1967, Lisbon, Ática)
- Grades (1970)
- 11 Poemas (1971)
- Dual (1972, Coímbra Moraes Editores; 3.ª ed., Lisbon, Salamandra, 1986)
- Antologia (1975)
- O Nome das Coisas (1977, Lisbon, Moraes Editores)
- Navegações (1983)
- Ilhas (1989)
- Musa (1994)
- Signo (1994)
- O Búzio de Cós (1997)
- Mar (2001) - antologia organizada por Maria Andresen de Sousa Tavares
- Primeiro Livro de Poesia (infanto-juvenil) (1999)
- Orpheu e Eurydice (2001)

==== Poems not included in the cannon poetry work ====
- "Juro que venho para mentir"; "És como a Terra-Mãe que nos devora"; "O mar rolou sobre as suas ondas negras"; "História improvável"; "Gráfico", Távola Redonda - Folhas de Poesia, nº 7, July 1950.
- "Reza da manhã de Maio"; "Poema", A Serpente - Fascículos de Poesia, nº 1, January 1951.
- "Caminho da Índia", A Cidade Nova, suplemento dos nº 4–5, 3rd series, Coimbra, 1958.
- "A viagem" [Fragmento do poema inédito "Naufrágio"], Cidade Nova, 5th series, nº 6, December 1958.
- "Novembro"; "Na minha vida há sempre um silêncio morto"; "Inverno", February - Textos de Poesia, 1972.
- "Brasil 77", Loreto 13 - Revista Literária da Associação Portuguesa de Escritores, nº 8, March 1982.
- "A veste dos fariseus", Jornal dos Poetas e Trovadores - Mensário de Divulgação Cultural, nº 5/6, 2nd series, March/April 1983.
- "Oblíquo Setembro de equinócio tarde", Portugal Socialista, January 1984.
- "Canção do Amor Primeiro", Sete Poemas para Júlio (National Library, quota nº L39709), 1988.
- "No meu Paiz", Escritor, nº 4, 1995.
- "D. António Ferreira Gomes. Bispo do Porto"; "Naquele tempo" ["Dois poemas inéditos"], Jornal de Letras, 16 June 1999.

=== Fiction ===
==== Tales ====
- Contos Exemplares (1962, Lisbon, Livraria Morais Editora; 24.ª ed. 1991)
- Histórias da Terra e do Mar (1984, Lisbon, Edições Salamandra; 3.ª ed., Lisbon, Texto Editora, 1989)

==== Children's books ====
- A Menina do Mar (1958)
- A Fada Oriana (1958)
- A Noite de Natal (1959)
- O Cavaleiro da Dinamarca (1964)
- O Rapaz de Bronze (1966)
- A Floresta (1968)
- O Tesouro (1970)
- A Árvore (1985)
- Os Ciganos (data não conhecida)

==== Theatre ====
- O Bojador (2000, Lisbon, Editorial Caminho)
- O Colar (2001, Lisbon, Editorial Caminho)
- O Azeiteiro (2000, Lisbon, Editorial Caminho)
- Filho de Alma e Sangue (1998, Lisbon, Editorial Caminho)
- Não chores minha Querida (1993, Lisbon, Editorial Caminho)

==== Essays ====
- "A poesia de Cecíla Meyrelles" (1956), Cidade Nova, 4th series, nº 6, November 1956
- Cecília Meyrelles (1958), in Cidade Nova
- Poesia e Realidade (1960), in Colóquio : Revista de Artes e Letras, nº 8
- "Hölderlin ou o lugar do poeta" (1967), Jornal de Comércio, 30 December 1967.
- O Nu na Antiguidade Clássica (1975), in O Nu e a Arte, Estúdios Cor, (2.ª ed., Lisbon, Portugália; 3.ª ed. [revista], Lisbon, Caminho, 1992)
- "Torga, os homens e a terra" (1976), Boletim da Secretaria de Estado da Cultura, Decembro 1976
- "Luiz de Camões. Ensombramentos e Descobrimentos" (1980), Cadernos de Literatura, nº 5
- "A escrita (poesia)" (1982/1984), Estudos Italianos em Portugal, nº 45/47

=== Andresen in English translations ===
- Marine Rose: Selected Poems tr. Ruth Fainlight (1987, Black Swan)
- Log Book: Selected Poems, tr. Richard Zenith (1997, Carcanet)
- The Perfect Hour, tr. Colin Rorrison with Margaret Jull Costa (2015, Cold Hub Press)

== In film ==
- In 1969 João César Monteiro made a short film about the poet, titled Sophia de Mello Breyner Andresen.
- In 1978 José Álvaro Morais directed Ma femme chamada Bicho, about and with Sophia de Mello Breyner Andresen.
- In 2016 Portuguese filmmaker Rita Azevedo Gomes released her film Correspondências, about the epistolary exchange between poets Sophia de Mello Breyner Andresen and Jorge de Sena.

== Awards and decorations ==
=== Awards ===
- In 1964: Grand Prize for Poetry by the Portuguese Writers Society for her book Livro Sexto (The Sixth Book).
- In 1977: Teixeira de Pascoaes Prize for her book O Nome das Coisas (The Name of Things).
- In 1983: Critics' Prize by the International Association of Critics for the full set of her work.
- In 1989: King Diniz Prize by the Casa de Mateus Foundation for her book Ilhas (Islands).
- In 1990: Grand Prize for Poetry by both Inasset/Inapa and Pen Club for her book Ilhas (Islands).
- In 1992: Calouste Gulbenkian's Grand Prize for Literature for Children by the Calouste Gulbenkian Foundation for the full set of her work.
- In 1994: "Vida Literária" (Literary Life) Prize by the Portuguese Association of Writers.
- In 1995: Honour Plaque of the Petrarca Prize by the Italian Association of Editors.
- In 1998: Luís Miguel Nava Foundation Prize for her book O Búzio de Cós e Outros Poemas.
- In 1999: the Camões Prize for Portuguese language literature. (She was the first woman to be awarded this prize.)
- In 2003: the Reina Sofia Prize for writers of Portugal, Spain and Latin America.

=== Decorations ===
- Grand Officer of the Military Order of Saint James of the Sword, Portugal (9 April 1981)
- Grand-Cross of the Order of Prince Henry, Portugal (13 February 1987)
- Grand-Cross of the Military Order of Saint James of the Sword, Portugal (6 June 1998)
- Grand-Collar of the Military Order of Saint James of the Sword, Portugal (6 November 2019)
