= Low-Flying Aircraft and Other Stories =

Collection of science fiction short stories by J.G. Ballard

Cover of first edition, published by Jonathan Cape.

Low-Flying Aircraft and Other Stories is a collection of science fiction short stories by British writer J. G. Ballard published in 1976.

== Contents ==
- "The Ultimate City" - A postmodernist retelling of The Tempest, Following the exhaustion of the world's supply of fossil fuels, a dwindling population abandons cities and sets up 'the first scientifically advanced agrarian society' based on solar wind and tidal power. The novella tells of Halloway who frustrated by the inertia he sees around him, builds a glider and flies back to the seemingly empty city and determines to re-create its lost vitality as described to him by his grandfather.
- "Low-Flying Aircraft" (first appeared in Bananas, Summer 1975) - Set in Empuriabrava in Spain in a world in which the population has fallen dramatically as more and more babies are born deformed. Forrester and his wife Judith await news of her latest pregnancy whilst watching a doctor making trips in a light aircraft collecting art treasures from abandoned museums and spraying silver paint across the landscape.
- "The Dead Astronaut" (first appeared in Playboy, May 1968) - Cape Canaveral no longer used for launches had become a crash zone for expired satellites, brought down to a homing beacon, Judith has come to await the arrival of a capsule containing Robert Hamilton, who had died in a freak meteorite collision some years previously. Judith has paid 5000 dollars for his remains.
- "My Dream of Flying to Wake Island" (first appeared in Ambit #60) Melville was 'the first astronaut to suffer a mental breakdown in space', and whilst recovering becomes obsessed with flying to Wake Island in a B-17 Flying Fortress he has discovered buried in the sand.
- "The Life and Death of God". In 1980 scientists at Jodrell Bank and Arecibo discovered that 'all electromagnetic radiations in fact contain a system of infinitely smaller vibrations' which 'permeated all matter and space', moreover computer analysis showed them to have a 'complex mathematical structure with all the attributes of intelligence', responding to the behaviour of the human observer.
- "The Greatest Television Show on Earth" (first appeared in Ambit #53) It is 2001 and a means of time travel has been discovered, but its expense means that only television companies can afford it. As they go back further in time they find that the reality they find is far less dramatic than what is recounted in history books. To maintain ratings they intervene, recruiting extras to boost numbers, supplying additional weapons and choreographing battles for dramatic effect. "History", as one producer concluded, "is just a first draft screenplay".
- "A Place and a Time to Die" (first appeared in New Worlds #194, Sep-Oct 1969) Mannock a retired police-chief has formed an uneasy alliance with Forbis, a used-car salesman as they prepare to defend their town against an approaching army.
- "The Comsat Angels" Researching a BBC Horizon documentary on child prodigies, James discovers links between them and makes a disturbing discovery.
- "The Beach Murders" (first appeared in Rogue, Jan 1966 under title Confetti Royale) A 'do-it-yourself espionage narrative' in which the clues comprise short alphabetically organised extracts of the plot.

== Media adaptions ==
Swedish film-maker Solveig Nordlund has directed, co-written and co-produced a Portuguese language film called Aparelho Voador a Baixa Altitude, an adaptation of the story "Low-Flying Aircraft".
