= As Bodas de Deus =

1999 film

- Directed by: João César Monteiro
- Written by: João César Monteiro
- Produced by: Paulo Branco
- Starring: Rita Durão; João César Monteiro
- Cinematography: Mário Barroso
- Edited by: Joaquim Pinto
- Release date: 15 October 1999
- Running time: 150 minutes
- Country: Portugal
- Language: Portuguese

As Bodas de Deus (literal English title: The Spousals of God) is a 1999 Portuguese comedy film directed by João César Monteiro. It was screened in the Un Certain Regard section at the 1999 Cannes Film Festival.

== Cast ==
- Rita Durão - Joana de Deus
- João César Monteiro - João de Deus
- Joana Azevedo - Elena Gombrowicz
- José Airosa - Omar Raschid
- Manuela de Freitas - Sister Bernarda
- Luís Miguel Cintra - God's Messenger
- Ana Galvão - Leonor (as Ana Velazquez)
- José Mora Ramos - Inspector Pantaleão
- Fernando Mora Ramos - Psychiatrist
- Fernando Heitor - Butler Vasconcelos
- João Listz - Sparafucile
- Jean Douchet - Bardamu
- Filipa Araújo - Celestina
- Sofia Marques - Nun
- Teresa Negrão - Inês
- Paulo Miranda - Agostinho

== Production ==
=== Development ===
João César Monteiro, in 1995, planned to shoot "The Comedy of God" and "The Wedding of God" as one film, in two parts, which he titled "Theology of God". The first would take place in Lisbon, as would happen, and the second in Paris, as would never happen. The production constraints in Paris between 1996 and 1997 were such that César Monteiro abandoned these plans and considered that "Theology of God" would remain incomplete. The director went ahead with another project, Le Basin de J.W., filmed between May and June 1997. The terrible reception reserved for that film, the "disorientation" the director said he experienced during and after Le Bassin, the impossibility of resuming in Paris the shooting of "The Wedding of God", led him to reconsider the script for "The Wedding of God".

This feature film is a Luso-French production, by Madragoa Filmes, RTP and Gemini Films. It closes the trilogy focused on the character of João de Deus, the protagonist, embodied in a poor devilish human good, with repeated autobiographical references, in a sarcastic and moody style. The intended result is to draw a caricature of someone less virtuous than vicious, author and actor of unqualified comedies in a hypocritical world, with abundant literary, artistic, and philosophical references. The film is dedicated to César Monteiro's wife, Margarida Gil, a director who collaborated with her husband on his works.
