= A Girl in Summer =

A Girl In Summer
- Directed by: Vítor Gonçalves
- Screenplay by: Vítor Gonçalves
- Produced by: José Bogalheiro
- Starring: Isabel Galhardo; Diogo Dória; João Perry; Virgílio Castelo; José Manuel Mendes; Alexandra Guimarães; Joaquim Leitão
- Cinematography: Daniel Del-Negro
- Edited by: Ana Luísa Guimarães
- Music by: Andrew Poppy
- Production company: Trópico Filmes
- Release date: 1986
- Running time: 85 minutes
- Country: Portugal
- Language: Portuguese

A Girl In Summer (Portuguese: Uma Rapariga No Verão) is a Portuguese film from 1986, directed by Vítor Gonçalves. It was considered by the Harvard Film Archive as One of the great Portuguese films of the 1980s, when screened as part of the School of Reis program.

== Release and reception ==
The film had its world premiere as part of the official selection of the Berlin Film Festival in 1986, and was part of the official selection of the International Film Festival Rotterdam. In 2012, the film was part of the School of Reis film program, at the Harvard Film Archive, also screened at the Anthology Film Archives and the UCLA Film and Television Archive.

== Cast ==
- Isabel Galhardo as Isabel
- Diogo Dória as Diogo
- Joaquim Leitão as Quim
- José Manuel Mendes as José
- João Perry as The Hunter
- Virgílio Castelo as João
- Alexandra Guimarães as Joana
- Rui Reininho as a dancer
