= Teatro da Cornucópia =

Theatre group in Lisbon, Portugal

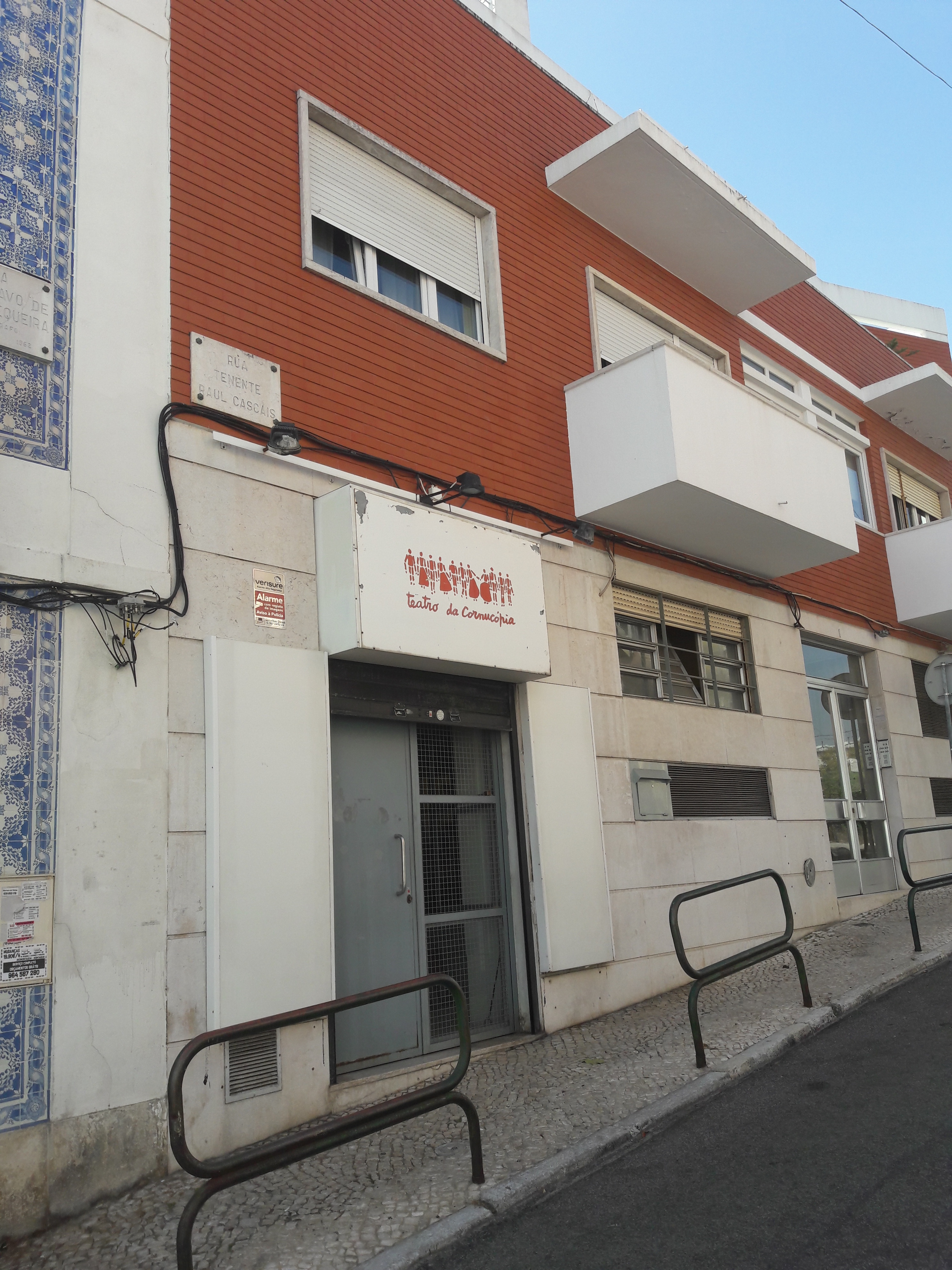
A Portrait of Teatro da Cornucópia

Teatro da Cornucópia was a theatre company in Portugal founded in 1973 by Jorge Silva Melo and Luís Miguel Cintra with the staging of the play The Misanthrope by Molière. The theatre was located at the Teatro do Bairro Alto, Rua Tenente Raul Cascais, Lisbon. Its activities ceased in December 2016..

It presented works by: Sophocles, Plauto, Seneca, Lope de Vega, Calderón de la Barca, Shakespeare, Corneille, Marivaux, Beaumarchais, Hölderlin, Schiller, Strindberg, Ibsen, Chekhov, Gorki, Ostróvski, Pirandello, Brecht, Catherine Dasté, Franz Xaver Kroetz, Michel Deutsch, Odon von Horváth, Georg Büchner, Karl Valentin, Dario Fo, Jean Paul Wenzel, Claudine Fiévet, Heiner Müller, Botho Strauss, William Wycherley, Edward Bond, Lorca, Igor Stravinsky, William Walton, Hans Werner Henze, Samuel Beckett, Joe Orton, Georg Buchner, Peter Handke, Georges Courteline, Genet, Jean-Claude Biette, Gertrude Stein, Lars Norén, Ferenc Molnár, Stig Dagerman, Heinrich von Kleist, Pasolini, R.W. Fassbinder, Christian Dietrich Grabbe, Jakob Lenz, Gil Vicente, Luís de Camões, Francisco de Holanda, António José da Silva, Almeida Garrett, Raul Brandão, Fiama H.P. Brandão, Eduarda Dionísio, Sophia M.B. Andresen, Manuel de Figueiredo, José Meireles and Ruy Belo.
