= As Armas e o Povo =

- Directed by: Colectivo de Trabalhadores da Actividade Cinematográfica
- Distributed by: Instituto do Cinema e Audiovisual
- Release date: November 1977
- Running time: 81 minutes
- Country: Portugal
- Language: Portuguese

As Armas e o Povo is a Portuguese collective documentary film directed and produced by the Collective of Workers of the Cinematographic Activity, on the initiative of the National Union of Cinema Professionals that portrays the period lived between the Carnation Revolution and the Labor Day of that year.

== Production ==
The production of the film was conducted by several Portuguese directors, joined by the Brazilian director Glauber Rocha, who was in exile at the time, due to the military dictatorship. They were divided into ten filming teams and took to the streets where they follow the events of the first Labor Day after the revolution.

It debuted in November 1977 at the Rosa Damasceno Theater, in Santarém.
