= Vítor Gonçalves =

- Born: March 14, 1951 (age 75); Angra do Heroísmo, Portugal
- Occupations: Film director, film writer, film producer

Vítor Gonçalves is a Portuguese filmmaker, film director, screenwriter and film producer. He is considered to be part of The School of Reis film family.

== Career ==
Vítor Gonçalves was born in 1951 to Vasco Gonçalves. In 1979, he graduated from the Escola de Cinema do Conservatório Nacional (now Escola Superior de Teatro e Cinema) with a degree in filmmaking, where he was a student of António Reis.

In 1984, Gonçalves, with José Bogalheiro, founded the independent production company Trópico Filmes. His debut film, A Girl In Summer, featuring Isabel Galhardo, Diogo Dória, João Perry and Joaquim Leitão in the leading roles, had its international premiere in 1986, at the Venice Film Festival. The film was the first work in cinema of future director Pedro Costa, as an assistant director. In 1989, Vítor Gonçalves produced Costa's debut film, Blood. Gonçalves spent the following years producing the 1992 film A Nuvem, directed by Ana Luísa Guimarães.

== Filmography ==
Director

- 1986 - A Girl In Summer
- 1988 - Midnight
- 2013 - The Invisible Life

Producer

- 1989 - Blood, directed by Pedro Costa (production manager)
- 1992 - A Nuvem, directed by Ana Luísa Guimarães (producer)
