= Solveig Nordlund =

Swedish-Portuguese filmmaker (born 1943)

- Born: Solveig Nordlund; June 9, 1943 (age 82); Stockholm, Sweden
- Occupation: Director
- Years active: 1976-present

Solveig Nordlund (born June 9, 1943) is a Swedish-Portuguese filmmaker.

== Biography ==
Nordlund grew up in Stockholm and has a BA degree in Art History from the Stockholm University. In 1962, she met Alberto Seixas Santos, whom she married, and her interest in cinema grew. In 1970, this interest transformed into a profession when she became an assistant on several films: Quem Espera por Sapatos de Defunto Morre Descalço by João César Monteiro (1969–1970), O Recado by José Fonseca e Costa (1970–1971), Pedro Só by Alfredo Tropa (1970–1971), and Fragmentos de Um Filme-Esmola by João César Monteiro (1972). With Brandos Costumes, by Alberto Seixas Santos (1973–1974), her name began to enter the credits as editor. She worked on editing the films of many directors, such as Manoel de Oliveira, João Botelho, Alberto Seixas Santos, and Thomas Harlan, as well as political documentaries.

In 1973-1974 she received a scholarship from the Calouste Gulbenkian Foundation and completed internships in Paris under the guidance of, among others, Jean Rouch. In 1974, she was in Cinequipa and, in 1975, Cinequanon, where she worked as an editor on TV series. As the founder of the Grupo Zero, Solveig participated in some films that were directed by multiple filmmakers, such as A Lei da Terra (1976). In 1978, she made her debut as an individual director in fiction films with Nem Pássaro, Nem Peixe.

She directed several films in collaboration with the Cornucopia Theater that were based on the plays of Franz Xaver Kroetz (Música Para Si, Viagem Para a Felicidade, both in 1978 and Outras Perspectivas in 1980) and Karl Valentin (E Não se Pode Exterminá-lo? - 1979). Her first feature film was Dina e Django (1983), followed by Até Amanhã, Mário (1994), Comédia Infantil (1998), Aparelho Voador a Baixa Altitude (2002) and A Filha (2003). She also directed short films and documentaries about writers, such as Marguerite Duras, J. G. Ballard and António Lobo Antunes. She is the founder of the independent film production company Ambar Filmes.

In 1998, she made her debut as a theater director with A Noite é Mãe do Dia, by Lars Norén, while working for Belém Cultural Center and Teatro da Malaposta. She currently collaborates with Artistas Unidos, where she has directed the plays Vai Vir Alguém (Someone Is Going To Come), Sonho de Outono (Autumn Dream) by Jon Fosse, Traições (Betrayal), Há Tanto Tempo by Harold Pinter and Scenes from a Marriage by Ingmar Bergman.

== Filmography ==
=== As director ===
- Conversas no Cabeleireiro, documentary series about: Sofia Areal, Purificação Araujo, Leonor Keil, Isabel do Carmo an Ana Bacalhau (2013)
- Amanhã (2003)
- A Filha (2003)
- Aparelho Voador a Baixa Altitude (2002)
- Spärrvakten (1999)
- Uma Voz na Noite (1998)
- Comédia Infantil (1998)
- António Lobo Antunes (1997)
- I morgon, Mario (Até amanhã, Mário) (1994)
- Bergtagen (1994)
- Vad hände katten i råttans år? (1985)
- Dina e Django (1983)
- Música Para Si (1979)
- Nem Pássaro Nem Peixe (1978)
- A Lei da Terra (1976) - Grupo Zero

=== As Editor (major works) ===
- I morgon, Mario (Até amanhã, Mário) (1994)
- A Casa de Bebel, by Jonas Cornell, Swedish TV series (1981)
- Passagem ou a Meio Caminho, by Jorge Silva Melo (1980)
- Alexandre e Rosa, short by João Botelho and Jorge Alves da Silva (1977–1978)
- Amor de Perdição, by Manoel de Oliveira (1976–1978)
- A Lei da Terra(1976) - Grupo Zero
- Moçambique – Um Programa Comemorativo da Independência (1975)
- Um Jornal Regional em Autogestão – “O Setubalense”, short by Amílcar Lyra (1975)
- Greve na Construção Civil, shor Cinequanon (1975)
- Brandos Costumes, by Alberto Seixas Santos (1975)
- Desapareceu, TV series, Cinequipa (1974)

== See also ==
Cinema of Portugal

Cinema Novo

== Bibliographical References ==
"RAMOS, Jorge Leitão". Dicionário do Cinema Português (1962–1988). Editorial Caminho, SA, Lisbon, 1989
