= O Sangue =

O Sangue (Blood)
- DVD cover
- Directed by: Pedro Costa
- Written by: Pedro Costa
- Produced by: Vítor Gonçalves
- Starring: Pedro Hestnes; Nuno Ferreira; Ines de Medeiros
- Cinematography: Martin Schafer
- Edited by: Manuela Viegas
- Release date: 1989
- Running time: 94 minutes
- Country: Portugal
- Language: Portuguese

O Sangue ([ɔ ˈsɐ̃ɡɨ], Blood) is the Portuguese filmmaker Pedro Costa's first feature film. Released in 1989, in black and white, the film depicts the impoverished life of two brothers, Vicente and Nino, after their father dies. With the help of Clara, Vicente's childhood friend, the trio struggle to survive, caught between their uncle's attempt to abduct/adopt Nino, and mobsters looking to collect the debts Vincente's father left behind. The film was selected as the Portuguese entry for the Best Foreign Language Film at the 64th Academy Awards, but was not accepted as a nominee.

The film clearly demonstrates Costa's cinephilic knowledge, as it recalls many scenes, sensations, and styles from classic filmmakers. Despite such references, this is not intended as mere quotation, because in the process Costa engraves his own vision. Adrian Martin writes

"...the poetics of certain filmmakers have been so deeply internalised, we might say say so deeply lived (in the imaginary realm) by Costa, that a unique palimpsest has been formed at the intersection of all these visions, all these worlds, all these memories: his signature is that knotted thicket, too tangled, fused and transformed to ever be cleanly separated, now, into its various separate source elements."

== See also ==
- List of submissions to the 64th Academy Awards for Best Foreign Language Film
- List of Portuguese submissions for the Academy Award for Best Foreign Language Film
