= Recollections of the Yellow House =

- Directed by: João César Monteiro
- Written by: João César Monteiro
- Starring: João César Monteiro; Manuela de Freitas; Ruy Furtado
- Release date: 1989
- Running time: 122 minutes
- Country: Portugal
- Language: Portuguese

Recollections of the Yellow House (Portuguese: Recordações da Casa Amarela) is a 1989 Portuguese film written and directed by João César Monteiro.

== Plot ==
João de Deus, a middle-aged man, lives in a cheap boarding house in an old part of Lisbon. He is plagued by illness. He relies on Franz Schubert's music and films to stave off misery. Isolated and eccentric, João obsesses over his landlady’s daughter, engaging in odd and sometimes disturbing behaviours such as drinking her bathwater and collecting her hair. After harassing his landlord's daughters, he is thrown out of his room. He is sent to a mental hospital, but he eventually manages to escape through the sewers.

== Cast ==
- João César Monteiro as João de Deus
- Manuela de Freitas as Dona Violeta
- Ruy Furtado as Senhor Armando
- Teresa Calado as Menina Julieta
- Duarte de Almeida as Ferdinando
- António Terrinha as the Doctor
- Sabina Sacchi as Mimi
- Henrique Viana as the Graduating Policeman
- Luís Miguel Cintra as Lívio
- Maria Ângela Violeta as Madre de Deus
- Violeta Sarzedas as the Next Door Neighbor
- João Pedro Bénard da Costa as the Dairy Worker
- Manuel Gomes as Laurindo
- Maria da Luz Fernandes as the Neighbor with the Baby
- Vasco Sequeira as the Tavern Owner
- José Nunes as the Kennel Worker
- Ester Caldeira, Ana Banhas, António Terrinha and Dona Gina as Neighbors
- João Santos as the Beggar
- Helena Ribas as the Policewoman
- Adamastor Duarte as the Policeman

== Awards ==
It was awarded the Silver Lion at the 46th Venice International Film Festival.
