= João César Monteiro =

Portuguese film director, actor, writer, and film critic

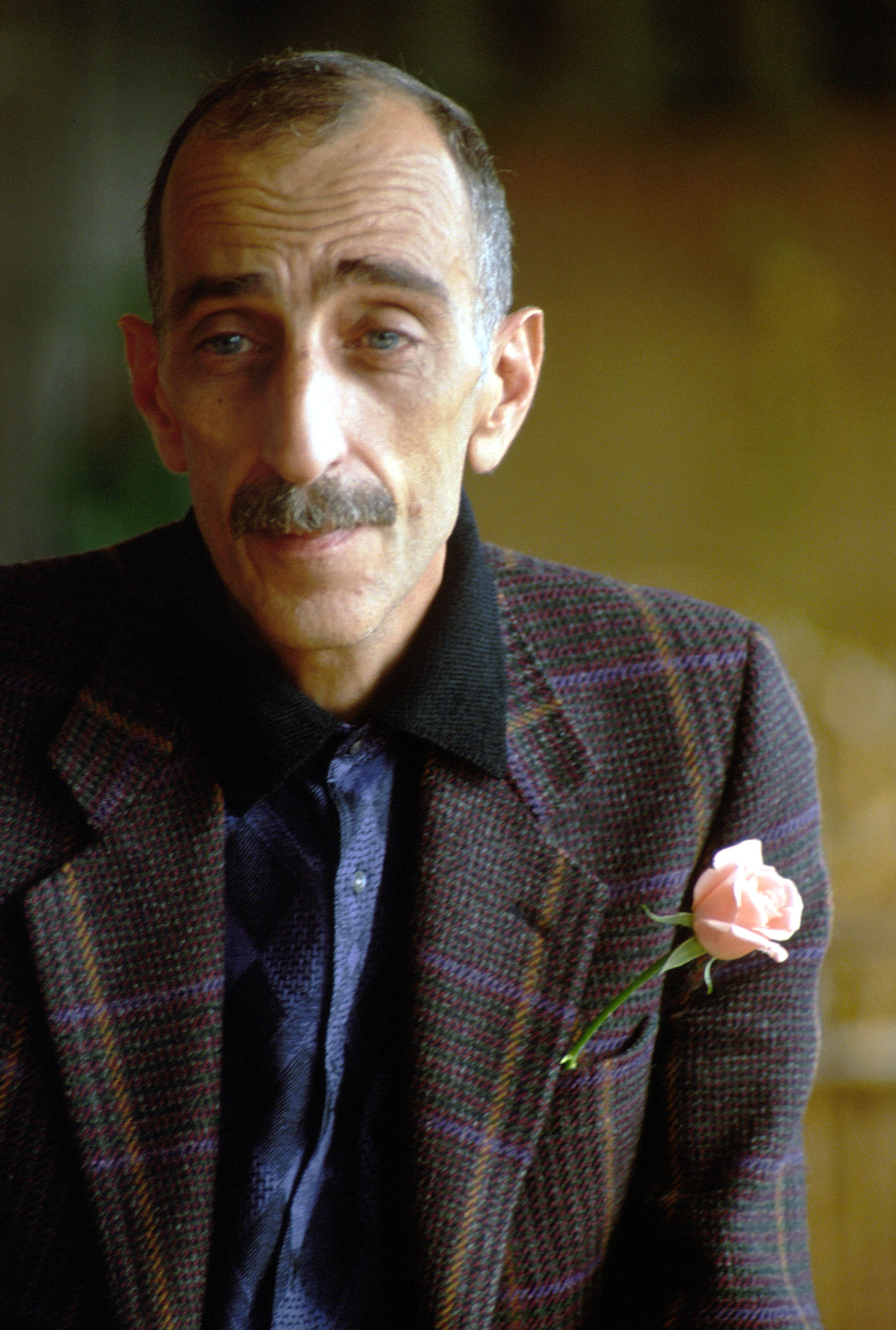
- Born: 2 February 1939; Figueira da Foz, Portugal
- Died: 3 February 2003 (aged 64); Lisbon, Portugal
- Education: London Film School
- Occupations: Film director, screenwriter, actor, writer
- Years active: 1969-2003
- Awards: Silver Lion for Recordações da Casa Amarela (1989)

João César Monteiro Santos (2 February 1939 – 3 February 2003) was a Portuguese film director, actor, writer and film critic. He is known for writing and directing films such as Recollections of the Yellow House (1989), God's Comedy (1995) and As Bodas de Deus (1999)

== Life and career ==
João César Monteiro was born into a family with anti-fascist and anti-clerical ideals. His family moved to Lisbon when Monteiro was 15 years old to enable him to continue his studies. In 1963, with a grant from the Calouste Gulbenkian Foundation, Monteiro traveled to Great Britain to study at the London Film School (known then as the London School of Film Technique). In 1965 in Portugal, he began work on his first film, Quem Espera por Sapatos de Defunto Morre Descalço (Who Waits for the Deceased's Shoes Dies Barefoot), which would not be finished for five years due to financial problems. At the same time, he made the short documentary "Sophia de Mello Breyner Andresen", about the Portuguese poet. Monteiro also wrote film criticism for periodicals like Imagem, Diário de Lisboa and O Século.

His first feature film was Fragmentos de um Filme Esmola: A Sagrada Família (1972). In 1982 he made Silvestre an adaptation of traditional Portuguese folk stories. Silvestre was shown at the Venice Film Festival and was an important step in his international recognition. À Flor do Mar (1986), featuring Laura Morante, was shown at the Salsomaggiore Film Festival, where it won the Special Jury Prize. Monteiro returned to the Venice Film Festival in 1989 with Recordações da Casa Amarela (Silver Lion), a film that marked the introduction of the character João de Deus. In 1992, he made O Último Mergulho, featuring Fabienne Babe.

A Comédia de Deus (Venice Film Festival, 1995), As Bodas de Deus (1999 Cannes Film Festival), Branca de Neve (Venice Film Festival, 2000) and Vai~E~Vem (Cannes Film Festival, 2003) were his last works. Branca de Neve (Snow White) was highly controversial because much of the film consists of a black screen, although a densely composed audio track plays throughout.

=== Style ===
One of the most controversial Portuguese filmmakers of his generation, João César Monteiro marked his presence in cinema with unclassifiable and polemic films made with idiosyncratic and somewhat experimental aesthetics, and influenced by his work as a film critic and a poet. In some of his last films, he played a recurrent protagonist, João de Deus, a remarkably articulated and over-sexualized character whose customary attitudes involved spontaneous streaks of hedonism, scandal and satire.

Although a substantial portion of his work was received with perplexity and outrage by the average movie-going audience, he has been recognized by Portuguese and international critics and academicians as one of the most important Portuguese directors, along with Manoel de Oliveira.

== Filmography ==
=== Feature films ===
Year	English Title	Original Title	Notes
1972	Fragments of an Alms-Film	Fragmentos de um Filme-Esmola: A Sagrada Família	
1975	What Shall I Do With This Sword?	Que Farei eu com Esta Espada?	
1978	Trails	Veredas	
1981	Silvestre		
1986	Hovering Over the Water	À Flor do Mar	Also actor
1989	Recollections of the Yellow House	Recordações da Casa Amarela	Also actor
1992	The Last Dive	O Último Mergulho	
1995	God's Comedy	A Comédia de Deus	Also actor
1997	The Hips of J.W.	Le Bassin de J.W.	Also actor
1999	The Spousals of God	As Bodas de Deus	Also actor
2000	Snow White	Branca de Neve	
2003	Come and Go	Vai e Vem	Also actor

=== Short films ===
Year	English Title	Original Title	Notes
1970	He Goes Long Barefoot That Waits For Dead Men’s Shoes	Quem Espera por Sapatos de Defunto Morre Descalço	
1978	The Two Soldiers	Os Dois Soldados	
1979	The Love of the Three Pomegranates	O Amor das Três Romãs	
1979	The Mother	A Mãe: O Rico e o Pobre	
1990	End of Conservation	Conserva Acabada	Also actor
1995	Lettera amorosa		Also actor
1995	Bestiary, or the Parade of Orpheus	O Bestiário ou o Cortejo de Orfeu	Also actor
1996	A Walk with Johnny Guitar	Passeio com Johnny Guitar	Also actor

=== Documentary ===
- Sophia de Mello Breyner Andresen (1969)

=== Only actor ===
- Amor de Perdição by Manoel de Oliveira (1979)
- A Estrangeira by João Mário Grilo (1983)
- Doc's Kingdom by Robert Kramer (1987)
- Relação Fiel e Verdadeira by Margarida Gil (1989)
- Paroles by Anne Benhaïem (1992)
- Rosa Negra by Margarida Gil (1992)
- La commedia di Dio by João César Monteiro (1995)
- Le Bassin de J.W. by João César Monteiro (1997)
- As Bodas de Deus by João César Monteiro (1999)
- Vai~E~Vem by João César Monteiro (2003)

== Books ==
- Corpo Submerso (1959)
- Morituri te Salutant (1974)
- Le Bassin de John Wayne (1998)
- As Bodas de Deus (1998)
- Uma Semana Noutra Cidade (1999)

== See also ==
- Jorge Ferreira Chaves
