= Jorge Silva Melo =

Portuguese actor, playwright, theatre director, and translator (1948–2022)

Jorge Freitas e Silva Melo
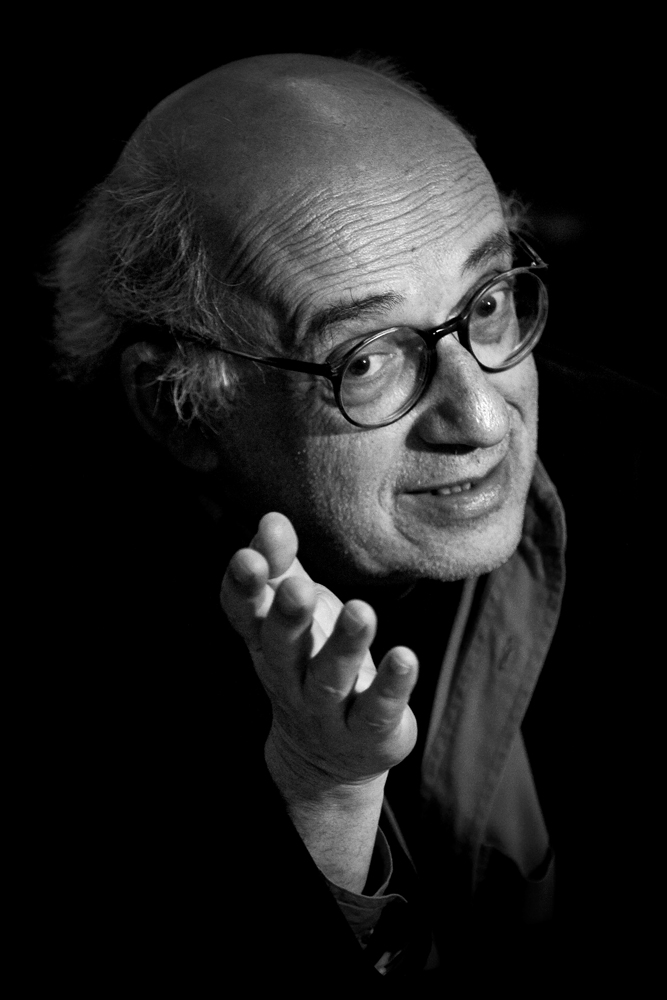
- Jorge Silva Melo in 2009
- Born: 7 August 1948; Lisbon, Portugal
- Died: 14 March 2022 (aged 73); Lisbon, Portugal
- Occupations: Actor, playwright, theatre director
- Years active: 1992–2022

Jorge Freitas e Silva Melo (7 August 1948 – 14 March 2022) was a Portuguese actor, playwright, theatre director, and translator.

== Career ==
In 1973, Melo founded the Teatro da Cornucópia with Luís Miguel Cintra. He received critical acclaim for his work as a playwright.
