= Modernist film =

Film genre

Modernist film is related to the art and philosophy of modernism as early modernist film came to maturity in the era between World War I and World War II, with characteristics such as montage and symbolic imagery, manifesting itself in genres as diverse as expressionism and surrealism (as featured in the works of Fritz Lang and Luis Buñuel) while postmodernist film – similar to postmodernism as a whole – is a reaction to modernist works, and to their tendencies (such as nostalgia and angst).

== Aesthetics ==
Modernist cinema has been said to have "explored and exposed the formal concerns of the medium by placing them at the forefront of consciousness." The auteur theory and idea of an author creating a work from their singular vision became a central characteristic of modernist filmmaking. It has been said that "To investigate the transparency of the image is modernist but to undermine its reference to reality is to engage with the aesthetics of postmodernism." The modernist film has more faith in the author, the individual, and the accessibility of reality itself (and generally has a more sincere tone) than the postmodernist film.

It also attempts to enlarge the film vocabulary against Hollywood's escapist entertainment and its reliance on narrative trappings which dominates the medium.

== List of specific modernist films ==
=== 20th century ===
- A Trip to the Moon (1902)
- The Cameraman's Revenge (1912)
- Fantômas: The Dead Man Who Killed (1913)
- Cabiria (1914)
- Silent Witnesses (1914)
- The Birth of a Nation (1915)
- Children of the Age (1915)
- Leon Drey (1915)
- Les Vampires (1915-1916)
- Children of the Age (1915)
- Intolerance (1916)
- The Fire (1916)
- A Life for a Life (1916)
- The Dying Swan (1917)
- The King of Paris (1917)
- Deviy Gory (1918)
- L'âtre (1919)
- J'accuse (1919)
- The Cabinet of Dr. Caligari (1920)
- Manhatta (1921)
- Rhythmus 21 (1921)
- Nosferatu (1922)
- Nanook of the North (1922)
- Dr. Mabuse the Gambler (1922)
- Ballet Mécanique (1923)
- La Roue (1923)
- Symphonie Diagonale (1923)
- The Extraordinary Adventures of Mr. West in the Land of the Bolsheviks (1924)
- The Last Laugh (1924)
- Sherlock Jr. (1924)
- L'Inhumaine (1924)
- Aelita (1924)
- Battleship Potemkin (1925)
- Feu Mathias Pascal (1925)
- The Marriage of the Bear (1925)
- The Gold Rush (1925)
- Mother (1926)
- Anemic Cinema (1926)
- Faust (1926)
- A Sixth Part of the World (1926)
- The General (1926)
- The Adventures of Prince Achmed (1926)
- A Page of Madness (1926)
- Ménilmontant (1926)
- The Lodger (1927)
- Sunrise: A Song of Two Humans (1927)
- Metropolis (1927)
- Berlin: Symphony of a Metropolis (1927)
- College (1927)
- Napoleon (1927)
- The Jazz Singer (1927)
- Zvenigora (1928)
- The Crowd (1928)
- The House on Trubnaya (1928)
- Steamboat Bill, Jr. (1928)
- The Passion of Joan of Arc (1928)
- The Fall of the House of Usher (1928)
- October: Ten Days That Shook the World (1928)
- The Cameraman (1928)
- Un Chien Andalou (1929)
- Man with a Movie Camera (1929)
- Blackmail (1929)
- Arsenal (1929)
- Queen Kelly (1929)
- Earth (1930)
- L'Age d'Or (1930)
- À propos de Nice (1930)
- Borderline (1930)
- Frankenstein (1931)
- Dracula (1931)
- M (1931)
- Douro, Faina Fluvial (1931)
- Tabu: A Story of the South Seas (1931)
- Tokyo Chorus (1931)
- City Lights (1931)
- La Natation par Jean Taris (1931)
- Two Happy Hearts (1932)
- The Blood of a Poet (1932)
- I Was Born, But... (1932)
- The Testament of Dr. Mabuse (1933)
- Zero for Conduct (1933)
- Fétiche Mascotte (1933)
- Land Without Bread (1933)
- Lot in Sodom (1933)
- Passing Fancy (1933)
- The Tale of Tsar Durondai (1934)
- It Happened One Night (1934)
- A Story of Floating Weeds (1934)
- L'Atalante (1934)
- Coal Face (1935)
- Peter Ibbetson (1935)
- Osaka Elegy (1936)
- Mr. Deeds Goes to Town (1936)
- Modern Times (1936)
- Arigato-San (1936)
- The Life of Emile Zola (1937)
- Lenin in October (1937)
- The Tale of the Fox (1937)
- Daffy Duck and Egghead (1938)
- Olympia (1938)
- You Can't Take It With You (1938)
- La vuelta al nido (1938)
- Thugs with Dirty Mugs (1939)
- Mr. Smith Goes to Washington (1939)
- Confessions of a Nazi Spy (1939)
- Stagecoach (1939)
- The Rules of the Game (1939)
- Beauty and the Beast (1946)
- Rebecca (1940)
- Fantasia (1940)
- The Great Dictator (1940)
- Tarantella (1940)
- The Heckling Hare (1941)
- Citizen Kane (1941)
- The Maltese Falcon (1941)
- Hellzapoppin' (1941)
- Cat People (1942)
- The Dover Boys at Pimento University (1942)
- Casablanca (1942)
- Aniki-Bóbó (1942)
- Meshes of the Afternoon (1943)
- Who Killed Who (1943)
- The Phantom Baron (1943)
- Screwball Squirrel (1944)
- Double Indemnity (1944)
- Hell-Bent for Election (1944)
- Rome, Open City (1945)
- Leave Her to Heaven (1945)
- Detour (1945)
- La Fiancée des ténèbres (1945)
- Gilda (1946)
- A Matter of Life and Death (1946)
- The Big Sleep (1946)
- It's a Wonderful Life (1946)
- Lonesome Lenny (1946)
- The Killers (1946)
- Beauty and the Beast (1946)
- Out of the Past (1947)
- The Lady from Shanghai (1947)
- Fireworks (1947)
- Monsieur Verdoux (1947)
- Spring in a Small Town (1948)
- Bicycle Thieves (1948)
- The Naked City (1948)
- The Boy with Green Hair (1948)
- Corridor of Mirrors (1948)
- Ragtime Bear (1949)
- The Third Man (1949)
- Gerald McBoing-Boing (1950)
- Giddyap (1950)
- The Asphalt Jungle (1950)
- Sunset Boulevard (1950)
- Rashomon (1950)
- Orpheus (1950)
- The Fall of Berlin (1950)
- The Peachy Gobbler (1950)
- Los Olvidados (1950)
- Rooty Toot Toot (1951)
- Symphony in Slang (1951)
- Miracle in Milan (1951)
- Son of Paleface (1952)
- Singin' in the Rain (1952)
- Magical Maestro (1952)
- Fear and Desire (1952)
- High Noon (1952)
- Umberto D (1952)
- Limelight (1952)
- Hurlements en faveur de Sade (1952)
- The First Time (1952)
- Duck Amuck (1953)
- Tokyo Story (1953)
- The Moon is Blue (1953)
- The Tell-Tale Heart (1953)
- Les vacances de Monsieur Hulot (1953)
- Glen or Glenda (1953)
- Toot, Whistle, Plunk and Boom (1953)
- Statues Also Die (1953)
- Susan Slept Here (1954)
- La Strada (1954)
- A Star is Born (1954)
- The River and Death (1954)
- Voyage to Italy (1954)
- Magnificent Obsession (1954)
- Rear Window (1954)
- Jail Bait (1954)
- La Pointe Courte (1955)
- Rebel Without a Cause (1955)
- Smiles of a Summer Night (1955)
- Artists and Models (1955)
- All That Heaven Allows (1955)
- Le amiche (1955)
- The Apu Trilogy (1955–1959)
- The Man with the Golden Arm (1955)
- Kiss Me Deadly (1955)
- Bride of the Monster (1955)
- Mr. Arkadin (1955)
- And God Created Woman (1956)
- Night and Fog (1956)
- The Killer Is Loose (1956)
- Momma Don't Allow (1956)
- The Girl Can't Help It (1956)
- On the Bowery (1956)
- The Jaywalker (1956)
- The Man in the Grey Flannel Suit (1956)
- The Killing (1956)
- Bob le flambeur (1956)
- Shadow (1956)
- Paths of Glory (1957)
- Kanał (1957)
- La cravate (1957)
- Wild Strawberries (1957)
- Desk Set (1957)
- N.Y., N.Y. (1957)
- Flebus (1957)
- Will Success Spoil Rock Hunter? (1957)
- Glimpse of the Garden (1957)
- Nights Of Cabiria (1957)
- The Cranes Are Flying (1957)
- The Seventh Seal (1957)
- Sweet Smell of Success (1957)
- Mars and Beyond (1957)
- What's Opera, Doc? (1957)
- Lettre de Sibérie (1957)
- 12 Angry Men (1957)
- Plan 9 from Outer Space (1957)
- Vertigo (1958)
- The Little Island (1958)
- Bell, Book and Candle (1958)
- Ashes and Diamonds (1958)
- Samac (1958)
- The Lovers (1958)
- Shadows (1958)
- Night of the Ghouls (1958)
- Murder by Contract (1958)
- Touch of Evil (1958)
- Mon Oncle (1958)
- A Movie (1958)
- Odds Against Tomorrow (1959)
- Ballad of a Soldier (1959)
- Hiroshima mon amour (1959)
- The 400 Blows (1959)
- Night Train (1959)
- The Wind (1959)
- North by Northwest (1959)
- Pillow Talk (1959)
- Nazarín (1959)
- The Best of Everything (1959)
- We Are the Lambeth Boys (1959)
- Les liaisons dangereuses (1959)
- Pickpocket (1959)
- Les Cousins (1959)
- Anatomy of a Murder (1959)
- Look Back in Anger (1959)
- Le petit soldat (1960)
- Peeping Tom (1960)
- L'Avventura (1960)
- Innocent Sorcerers (1960)
- La Dolce Vita (1960)
- Breathless (1960)
- Ocean's 11 (1960)
- Rocco and His Brothers (1960)
- Splendid Days (1960)
- Zazie dans le Métro (1960)
- The Sinister Urge (1960)
- Psycho (1960)
- Shoot the Piano Player (1960)
- The Bellboy (1960)
- Les Bonnes Femmes (1960)
- Eyes Without a Face (1960)
- Night and Fog in Japan (1960)
- Saturday Night and Sunday Morning (1960)
- Viridiana (1961)
- Breakfast at Tiffany's (1961)
- The Ladies Man (1961)
- Cry for Happy (1961)
- Cuba Sí! (1961)
- Il posto (1961)
- Lover Come Back (1961)
- The Connection (1961)
- Last Year at Marienbad (1961)
- A Taste of Honey (1961)
- West Side Story (1961)
- The Human Pyramid (1961)
- One Hundred and One Dalmatians (1961)
- Allures (1961)
- La Notte (1961)
- A Woman Is a Woman (1961)
- Surogat (1961)
- The Errand Boy (1961)
- Paris Belongs to Us (1961)
- Big Troubles (1961)
- Through a Glass Darkly (1961)
- The Loneliness of the Long Distance Runner (1962)
- Boys' Night Out (1962)
- Cleo from 5 to 7 (1962)
- Jules and Jim (1962)
- Gay Purr-ee (1962)
- Experiment in Terror (1962)
- Adieu Philippine (1962)
- Two Weeks in Another Town (1962)
- La Jetee (1962)
- Knife in the Water (1962)
- Ivan's Childhood (1962)
- Vivre sa Vie (1962)
- L'Eclisse (1962)
- Salvatore Giuliano (1962)
- The Trial (1962)
- Mamma Roma (1962)
- The Exterminating Angel (1962)
- The Story of a Crime (1962)
- Le Doulos (1962)
- The Girl Who Knew Too Much (1963)
- The Critic (1963)
- 8½ (1963)
- The Silence (1963)
- Acto da Primavera (1963)
- Tom Jones (1963)
- Shock Corridor (1963)
- The Little Prince and the Eight-Headed Dragon (1963)
- The Servant (1963)
- Now Hear This (1963)
- The Nutty Professor (1963)
- High and Low (1963)
- Le Joli Mai (1963)
- Muriel (1963)
- Le Mépris (1963)
- Corruption (1963)
- Woman in the Dunes (1964)
- Dr. Strangelove (1964)
- Bande à part (1964)
- The Umbrellas of Cherbourg (1964)
- Marnie (1964)
- Mass for the Dakota Sioux (1964)
- Welcome, or No Trespassing (1964)
- Tale About the Lost Time (1964)
- Lemonade Joe (1964)
- Bir İçim Su (1964)
- Black God, White Devil (1964)
- Red Desert (1964)
- The Patsy (1964)
- Before the Revolution (1964)
- Walking the Streets of Moscow (1964)
- Black Peter (1964)
- Pale Flower (1964)
- I am Cuba (1964)
- Blood and Black Lace (1964)
- Ilich's Gate (1965)
- Identification Marks: None (1965)
- Time Piece (1965)
- Pierrot le Fou (1965)
- Operation Y and Shurik's Other Adventures (1965)
- Chimes at Midnight (1965)
- The Hand (1965)
- Alphaville (1965)
- Shadows of Forgotten Ancestors (1965)
- Simon of the Desert (1965)
- Boniface's Holiday (1965)
- Give Me a Book of Complaints (1965)
- The Manuscript Zaragoza (1965)
- Man is Not a Bird (1965)
- Juliet of the Spirits (1965)
- Red Beard (1965)
- Andrei Rublev (1966)
- Breakaway (1966)
- Les Créatures (1966)
- Persona (1966)
- Wings (1966)
- The Pop Show (1966)
- The Story of Asya Klyachina (1966)
- Young Törless (1966)
- Fahrenheit 451 (1966)
- The Man in the Frame (1966)
- Blowup (1966)
- Seconds (1966)
- Black Girl (1966)
- Au hasard Balthazar (1966)
- Daisies (1966)
- The Shooting (1966)
- Made in U.S.A. (1966)
- Nueve cartas a Berta (1966)
- Father (1966)
- Tokyo Drifter (1966)
- Masculin Feminin (1966)
- Monday or Tuesday (1966)
- Violence at Noon (1966)
- Trans-Europ-Express (1966)
- Barrier (1966)
- The Young Girls of Rochefort (1967)
- Weekend (1967)
- Portrait of Jason (1967)
- Le Samouraï (1967)
- Far from Vietnam (1967)
- Brief Encounters (1967)
- Playtime (1967)
- Accident (1967)
- Happy End (1967)
- The Witches (1967)
- Report (1967)
- Commissar (1967)
- The Firemen's Ball (1967)
- I Am Curious (Yellow) (1967)
- Viy (1967)
- Point Blank (1967)
- Love Affair, or the Case of the Missing Switchboard Operator (1967)
- Branded to Kill (1967)
- Le Départ (1967)
- Two or Three Things I Know About Her (1967)
- In Like Flint (1967)
- Mouchette (1967)
- Belle de Jour (1967)
- La Chinoise (1967)
- The Big Mouth (1967)
- La Collectionneuse (1967)
- The Eve of Ivan Kupala (1968)
- Teorema (1968)
- Symbiopsychotaxiplasm: Take One (1968)
- Black Panthers (1968)
- Medium Cool (1968)
- Monterey Pop (1968)
- La Sixième Face du Pentagone (1968)
- 2001: A Space Odyssey (1968)
- No Path Through Fire (1968)
- Faces (1968)
- God Respects Us When We Work, But Loves Us When We Dance (1968)
- The Glass Harmonica (1968)
- Tres tristes tigres (1968)
- Death by Hanging (1968)
- Sympathy for the Devil (1968)
- The Chronicle of Anna Magdalena Bach (1968)
- If.... (1968)
- Petulia (1968)
- Memories of Underdevelopment (1968)
- Film, Film, Film (1968)
- Je t'aime, je t'aime (1968)
- The Garden (1968)
- Hour of the Wolf (1968)
- The Rite (1968)
- Horus, Prince of the Sun (1968)
- Extraordinary Exhibition (1968)
- Spirits of the Dead (1968)
- A Quiet Place in the Country (1968)
- I Am Curious (Blue) (1968)
- Funeral Parade of Roses (1969)
- In the Year of the Pig (1969)
- My Name Is Oona (1969)
- Kes (1969)
- Joy of Learning (1969)
- Lemon (1969)
- The Color of Pomegranates (1969)
- Easy Rider (1969)
- L'Amour fou (1969)
- The Passion of Anna (1969)
- Stereo (1969)
- The Milky Way (1969)
- The Rite (1969)
- Eros + Massacre (1969)
- Hunting Scenes from Bavaria (1969)
- Fellini Satyricon (1969)
- Pirosmani (1969)
- Love Is Colder Than Death (1969)
- My Night at Maud's (1969)
- Everything for Sale (1969)
- Charles, Dead or Alive (1969)
- Z (1969)
- Katzelmacher (1969)
- The Conformist (1970)
- Fruit of Paradise (1970)
- Zabriskie Point (1970)
- Gimme Shelter (1970)
- Crimes of the Future (1970)
- Lovefilm (1970)
- La colonia penal (1970)
- Zorns Lemma (1970)
- Performance (1970)
- Valerie and Her Week of Wonders (1970)
- One More Time (1970)
- Eden and After (1970)
- Alex in Wonderland (1970)
- The Bird with the Crystal Plumage (1970)
- Eden and After (1970)
- The Man Who Left His Will on Film (1970)
- Which Way to the Front? (1970)
- Claire's Knee (1970)
- Husbands (1970)
- Shine, Shine, My Star (1970)
- Hydrozagadka (1970)
- Taking Off (1971)
- The Murder of Fred Hampton (1971)
- Throw Away Your Books, Rally in the Streets (1971)
- Walkabout (1971)
- W.R.: Mysteries of the Organism (1971)
- The Long Farewell (1971)
- Punishment Park (1971)
- Two-Lane Blacktop (1971)
- Trafic (1971)
- Death in Venice (1971)
- The Last Movie (1971)
- Beware of a Holy Whore (1971)
- The Dodger (1971)
- The Case of the Scorpion's Tail (1971)
- A Clockwork Orange (1971)
- Szindbád (1971)
- The Twelve Chairs (1971)
- The Decameron (1971)
- Minnie and Moskowitz (1971)
- Emperor Tomato Ketchup (1971)
- Solaris (1972)
- Tarot (1972)
- The Canterbury Tales (1972)
- Don't Torture a Duckling (1972)
- Aguirre, the Wrath of God (1972)
- The Discreet Charm of the Bourgeoisie (1972)
- Tout va bien (1972)
- O Passado e o Presente (1972)
- Cries and Whispers (1972)
- The Master and Margaret (1972)
- Love in the Afternoon (1972)
- Happy Go Lucky (1972)
- Last Tango in Paris (1972)
- Ludwig: Requiem for a Virgin King (1972)
- Roma (1972)
- Belladonna of Sadness (1973)
- Ivan Vasilievich Changes His Profession (1973)
- The Mongols (1973)
- The Hourglass Sanatorium (1973)
- Day for Night (1973)
- F for Fake (1973)
- The Holy Mountain (1973)
- Mean Streets (1973)
- Don't Look Now (1973)
- Fantastic Planet (1973)
- Amarcord (1973)
- The Mother and the Whore (1973)
- The Illumination (1973)
- Badlands (1973)
- Apple in the River (1974)
- A Woman Under the Influence (1974)
- The Diary (1974)
- Arabian Nights (1974)
- Pastoral: To Die in the Country (1974)
- The Conversation (1974)
- Steppenwolf (1974)
- Céline and Julie Go Boating (1974)
- Alice in the Cities (1974)
- Cockfighter (1974)
- Lancelot du Lac (1974)
- Ali: Fear Eats the Soul (1974)
- Himiko (1974)
- The Phantom of Liberty (1974)
- The Red Snowball Tree (1974)
- Zardoz (1974)
- The Passenger (1975)
- It Can't Be! (1975)
- Benilde ou a Virgem Mãe (1975)
- The Irony of Fate (1975)
- Shivers (1975)
- Barry Lyndon (1975)
- Sholay (1975)
- The Travelling Players (1975)
- Afonya (1975)
- Arabesque (1975)
- The Lost Honour of Katharina Blum (1975)
- One Hundred Days After Childhood (1975)
- Jeanne Dielman, 23 quai du Commerce, 1080 Bruxelles (1975)
- A Textile Worker (1975)
- Mirror (1975)
- Deep Red (1975)
- Cría cuervos (1976)
- In the Realm of the Senses (1976)
- Mr. Klein (1976)
- The Killing of a Chinese Bookie (1976)
- The Tenant (1976)
- Fellini's Casanova (1976)
- The House with Laughing Windows (1976)
- The Raven (1976)
- Man of Marble (1977)
- Stroszek (1977)
- Rabid (1977)
- That Obscure Object of Desire (1977)
- Mimino (1977)
- The Hunters (1977)
- The Apple Game (1977)
- Opening Night (1977)
- An Unfinished Piece for Mechanical Piano (1977)
- The American Friend (1977)
- Germany in Autumn (1978)
- Getting to Know the Big, Wide World (1978)
- Days of Heaven (1978)
- The Pyjama Girl Case (1978)
- Amor de Perdição (1978)
- La vocation suspendue (1978)
- Despair (1978)
- Les Rendez-vous d'Anna (1978)
- Stalker (1979)
- The Marriage of Maria Braun (1979)
- Tale of Tales (1979)
- Vengeance Is Mine (1979)
- Bubble Bath (1979)
- Dog's Dialogue (1979)
- Apocalypse Now (1979)
- Ticket of No Return (1979)
- Dead Mountaineer's Hotel (1979)
- Camera Buff (1979)
- Autumn Marathon (1979)
- Sisters, or the Balance of Happiness (1979)
- Csontváry (1980)
- Alexander the Great (1980)
- Dressed to Kill (1980)
- Ski Scenes with Franz Klammer (1980)
- Moscow Does Not Believe in Tears (1980)
- Personal Problems (1980)
- Hardly Working (1980)
- The Shining (1980)
- Inferno (1980)
- Son of the White Mare (1981)
- Plasticine Crow (1981)
- Marianne and Juliane (1981)
- Hatsu Yume (First Dream) (1981)
- Lola (1981)
- In the Shadow of the Sun (1981)
- The Territory (1981)
- The Angel (1982)
- Veronika Voss (1982)
- Fitzcarraldo (1982)
- The State of Thing (1982)
- Les trois couronnes du matelot (1982)
- The Queen of Spades (1982)
- Querelle (1982)
- Tenebrae (1982)
- Benvenuta (1983)
- The Dead Zone (1983)
- Last Year's Snow Was Falling (1983)
- Into the Cellar (1983)
- Nostalghia (1983)
- Videodrome (1983)
- Wow, a Talking Fish! (1983)
- Smorgasbord (1983)
- The Ploughman's Lunch (1983)
- In the Blue Sea, in the White Foam... (1984)
- A Summer at Grandpa's (1984)
- Nausicaä of the Valley of the Wind (1984)
- Love Streams (1984)
- The Element of Crime (1984)
- Yellow Earth (1984)
- My Beautiful Laundrette (1985)
- The Time to Live and the Time to Die (1985)
- Le Soulier de satin (1985)
- Terrorizers (1986)
- Wild Pigeon (1986)
- The Decline of the American Empire (1986)
- Mona Lisa (1986)
- Courier (1986)
- The Horse Thief (1986)
- The Fly (1986)
- The Veldt (1987)
- Where Is the Friend's House? (1987)
- Prick Up Your Ears (1987)
- Full Metal Jacket (1987)
- Mister Designer (1987)
- The Cyclist (1987)
- High Hopes (1988)
- On the Silver Globe (1988)
- Landscape in the Mist (1988)
- Red Sorghum (1988)
- Creature Comforts (1989)
- Jesus of Montreal (1989)
- The Initiated (1989)
- A City of Sadness (1989)
- Close-Up (1990)
- Mind's Eye (1990)
- Passport (1990)
- Non, ou a Vã Glória de Mandar (1990)
- A Brighter Summer Day (1991)
- Craving Passion (1991)
- The Adjuster (1991)
- Naked Lunch (1991)
- Happy Days (1991)
- The Double Life of Véronique (1991)
- Raise the Red Lantern (1991)
- A Divina Comédia (1991)
- The Lawnmower Man (1992)
- The Stone (1992)
- Bram Stoker's Dracula (1992)
- The Shadow Play (1992)
- La Chasse aux papillons (1992)
- The Actor (1993)
- Blue (1993)
- Calendar (1993)
- The Thief and the Cobbler (1993)
- Vale Abraão (1993)
- Farewell My Concubine (1993)
- The Castle (1994)
- Sátántangó (1994)
- Through the Olive Trees (1994)
- The White Balloon (1995)
- Ulysses' Gaze (1995)
- Saalam Cinema (1995)
- Breaking the Waves (1996)
- Trois vies et une seule mort (1996)
- Gabbeh (1996)
- The Bandit (1996)
- The Mirror (1997)
- Level Five (1997)
- Généalogies d'un crime (1997)
- The Secret Aesthetics of the Martian Spies (1997)
- Viagem ao Princípio do Mundo (1997)
- Princess Mononoke (1997)
- The Ice Storm (1997)
- Taste of Cherry (1997)
- Khrustalyov, My Car! (1998)
- Zenboxing (1998)
- Eternity and a Day (1998)
- The Idiots (1998)
- The Thin Red Line (1998)
- Julien Donkey-Boy (1999)
- Eyes Wide Shut (1999)
- Le temps retrouvé (1999)
- The Day I Became a Woman (2000)
- The Circle (2000)
- Palavra e Utopia (2000)
- Timecode (2000)
- Yi Yi (2000)

=== 21st century ===
- Millennium Mambo (2001)
- A.I.: Artificial Intelligence (2001)
- Vidocq (2001)
- Je rentre à la maison (2001)
- All About Lily Chou-Chou (2001)
- Elegy of a Voyage (2001)
- Trouble Every Day (2001)
- Hotel (2002)
- War (2002)
- Ten (2002)
- Russian Ark (2002)
- Star Wars: Attack of the Clones (2002)
- Corpus Callosum (2002)
- Hero (2002)
- Cremaster 3 (2002)
- Destino (2003)
- Party Monster (2003)
- Spy Kids 3-D: Game Over (2003)
- Crimson Gold (2003)
- Goodbye, Dragon Inn (2003)
- Um Filme Falado (2003)
- Casshern (2004)
- Sky Captain and the World of Tomorrow (2004)
- Hana and Alice (2004)
- Kamikaze girls (2004)
- Lovelorn (2005)
- Sin City (2005)
- Death of Mr. Lazarescu (2005)
- The New World (2005)
- Inland Empire (2006)
- Belle Toujours (2006)
- Klimt (2006)
- Miami Vice (2006)
- Offside (2006)
- Ultraviolet (2006)
- 300 (2006)
- Memories of Matsuko (2006)
- Summer Love (2006)
- The Tracey Fragments (2007)
- Slipstream (2007)
- Speed Racer (2008)
- The Spirit (2008)
- Love Exposure (2008)
- Morphine (2008)
- Antichrist (2009)
- Valhalla Rising (2009)
- Tetsuo: The Bullet Man (2009)
- I Am Love (2009)
- Le Père de mes enfants (2009)
- Film Socialisme (2010)
- Mistérios de Lisboa (2010)
- A Stoker (2010)
- Twixt (2011)
- Melancholia (2011)
- A Dangerous Method (2011)
- The Tree of Life (2011)
- Holy Motors (2012)
- Life of Pi (2012)
- Leviathan (2012)
- Resident Evil: Retribution (2012)
- The Hobbit (2012-2014)
- Me Too (2012)
- Goltzius and the Pelican Company (2012)
- To the Wonder (2012)
- The Rambler (2013)
- Exhibition (2013)
- The Great Gatsby (2013)
- Hard to Be a God (2013)
- Real (2013)
- CENTER JENNY (2013)
- The Wind Rises (2013)
- Goodbye to Language (2014)
- Hyperlinks or It Didn't Happen (2014)
- The Grand Budapest Hotel (2014)
- Tangerine (2015)
- Frankofonia (2015)
- Aferim! (2015)
- Blackhat (2015)
- Knight of Cups (2015)
- Journey to the Shore (2015)
- The Walk (2015)
- Despite the Night (2015)
- Cosmos (2015)
- Billy Lynn's Long Halftime Walk (2016)
- Voyage of Time (2016)
- Shin Godzilla (2016)
- The Dead Nation (2017)
- 24 Frames (2017)
- Let the Summer Never Come Again (2017)
- Song to Song (2017)
- Hanagatami (2017)
- Twin Peaks: The Return (2017)
- Columbus (2017)
- I Do Not Care If We Go Down in History as Barbarians (2018)
- The Image Book (2018)
- Killing (2018)
- Unsane (2018)
- Gemini Man (2019)
- Family Romance, LLC (2019)
- A Hidden Life (2019)
- Labyrinth of Cinema (2019)
- Polar (2019)
- Desire Path (2020)
- The Five Rules of Success (2021)
- Minor Daemon, Vol. 1 (2021)
- Zeros and Ones (2021)
- Dune (2021)
- Hinterland (2021)
- The Green Knight (2021)
- The People's Joker (2022)
- Fairytale (2022)
- Shin Ultraman (2022)
- Counterfeit Poast (2022)
- The Outwaters (2022)
- Aggro Dr1ft (2023)
- The Human Surge 3 (2023)
- Megalopolis (2024)
- Baby Invasion (2024)
- The Code (2024)
- 28 Years Later (2025)
- The Odyssey (2026)

== List of notable modernist filmmakers ==
- Chantal Ackerman
- Atom Agoyan
- Robert Aldrich
- Theo Angelopoulos
- Michelangelo Antonioni
- Dario Argento
- Tex Avery
- Aleksei Balabanov
- Yevgeny Bauer
- Jordan Belson
- Ingmar Bergman
- Stan Brakhage
- Robert Breer
- Robert Bresson
- Brumberg Sisters
- Luis Buñuel
- Mary Ellen Bute
- Frank Capra
- John Cassavetes
- Claude Chabrol
- Charlie Chaplin
- Henri Chomette
- Vera Chytilová
- Vladislav Starevich
- Shirley Clarke
- Bruce Conner
- Robert Altman
- Francis Ford Coppola
- David Cronenberg
- Georgiy Daneliya
- Jules Dassin
- Emile de Antonio
- Yavuz Turgul
- Sean Baker
- Claire Denis
- Maya Deren
- Alexander Dovzhenko
- Manoel de Oliveira
- Carl Theodore Dreyer
- Blake Edwards
- Sergei Eisenshtein
- Rainer Werner Fassbinder
- Federico Fellini
- Louis Feuillade
- David Fincher
- Oskar Fischinger
- John Ford
- Miloš Forman
- Hollis Frampton
- Sam Fuller
- Leonid Gaidai
- Abel Gance
- Aleksei German
- Jean-Luc Godard
- William Greaves
- D.W. Griffith
- Monte Hellman
- Werner Herzog
- Alfred Hitchcock
- Hou Hsiao-hsien
- John and Faith Hubley
- John Huston
- Zoltán Huszárik
- Stephen Frears
- Chuck Jones
- Radu Jude
- Chen Kaige
- Jerzy Kawalerowicz
- Buster Keaton
- Fyodor Khitruk
- Abbas Kiarostami
- William Klein
- Stanley Kubrick
- Lev Kuleshov
- Akira Kurosawa
- Fritz Lang
- Jerry Lewis
- Arthur Lipsett
- Oldřich Lipský
- Joseph Losey
- George Lucas
- Ida Lupino
- Len Lye
- Dusan Makavejev
- Mohsen Makhmalbaf
- Terrence Malick
- Louis Malle
- Chris Marker
- Norman McLaren
- Jonas Mekas
- Jean-Pierre Melville
- Marie Menken
- Oscar Micheaux
- Tsai Ming-liang
- Vincente Minnelli
- Hayao Miyazaki
- Kira Muratova
- Friedrich Wilhelm Murnau
- Yasujirō Ozu
- Jafar Panahi
- Sergei Parajanov
- Pier Paolo Pasolini
- Ernest Pintoff
- Yakov Protazanov
- Vsevolod Pudovkin
- Cristi Puiu
- Nicholas Ray
- Satyajit Ray
- Jean Renoir
- Alain Resnais
- Tony Richardson
- Jacques Rivette
- Alain Robbe-Grillet
- Robert Rodriguez
- Roberto Rossellini
- Raúl Ruiz
- Walter Ruttmann
- Paul Sharits
- Terayama Shūji
- Douglas Sirk
- Robert Sahakyants
- Harry Everett Smith
- Michael Snow
- Steven Soderbergh
- Alexander Sokurov
- Sergei Solovyov
- István Szabó
- Andrei Tarkovsky
- Béla Tarr
- Frank Tashlin
- Jacques Tati
- Jacques Tourneur
- Jiri Trnka
- François Truffaut
- Hermína Týrlová
- Agnès Varda
- Bernardo Bertolucci
- Dziga Vertov
- Jean Vigo
- Luchino Visconti
- Andrzej Wajda
- Andy Warhol
- Orson Welles
- Wim Wenders
- John Whitney
- Ed Wood
- Edward Yang
- Zhang Yimou
- Andrei Zvyagintsev

== See also ==
- Minimalist film
  - Maximalist film
- European art cinema
- Italian futurism cinema
- German expressionist cinema
- Poetic realism
- Soviet avant-garde cinema
- Cinéma vérité
- Classical Hollywood cinema
- Film noir
- Italian neorealism
- Indian Parallel Cinema
- French New Wave
- Soviet New Wave
- New German Cinema
- New Hollywood
- British New Wave
- Yugoslav Black Wave
- Iranian New Wave
- Dogme 95
- New Turkish Cinema
- Romanian New Wave
- Remodernist film
- Melodrama
- Arthouse animation
- Indiewood
- Art horror
- B movie
- Art film
- European art cinema
- Structural film
- Vulgar auteurism
- World cinema
- Slow cinema
- Golden age of American animation
- Independent animation
- Limited animation
- Mid century modern
- Postmodernist film
- A Personal Journey with Martin Scorsese Through American Movies
- Arthouse musical
- Arthouse science fiction film
- Avant-garde film
- Slapstick film
