= List of Portuguese submissions for the Academy Award for Best International Feature Film =

Best International Feature Film submissions from Portugal

Highlights
- Debut: 1980
- Submissions: 43
- Nominations: none
- Oscar winners: none

Portugal has submitted films for the Academy Award for Best International Feature Film (Note: The category was previously named the Academy Award for Best Foreign Language Film, but this was changed to the Academy Award for Best International Feature Film in April 2019, after the Academy deemed the word "Foreign" to be outdated.) since 1980. The award is given annually by the United States Academy of Motion Picture Arts and Sciences to a feature-length motion picture produced outside the United States that contains primarily non-English dialogue.

As of 2026, Portugal has submitted forty-three films, but none of them were nominated. The country holds the record of the most submissions without a nomination in the category.

== Submissions ==
The Academy of Motion Picture Arts and Sciences has invited the film industries of various countries to submit a film for consideration for the Academy Award for Best International Feature Film since 1956 (before this, it was given as an honorary award from 1947 to 1955). The International Feature Film Committee oversees the process and reviews all the submitted films, releasing a shortlist of 10 films in mid-December. Following this, they vote via secret ballot to determine the five nominees for the award.

The Portuguese nominee was selected by a jury selected by the Instituto do Cinema e do Audiovisual (in English, the Cinema and Audiovisual Institute). Since 2012, the submission is selected by the Portuguese Academy of Cinema.

Manoel de Oliveira is the filmmaker with most films selected to represent the country, with eight submissions. Other legendary Portuguese filmmakers submitted include: João Botelho, Pedro Costa, and João César Monteiro.

The country first and only nomination in the awards ceremony came with the animated short film Ice Merchants (2022), directed by João Gonzalez, which was nominated for the Academy Award for Best Animated Short Film.

All films submitted are primary in Portuguese, with the exception of Belle Toujours (2007), which is in French. Below is a list of the films that have been submitted by Portugal for review by the academy for the category by year.

Year (Ceremony)	Film title used in nomination	Original title	Director(s)	Result
1980 (53rd)	Morning Undersea	Manhã Submersa	Lauro António	Not nominated
1982 (55th)	Francisca		Manoel de Oliveira	Not nominated
1983 (56th)	No Trace of Sin	Sem Sombra de Pecado	José Fonseca e Costa	Not nominated
1984 (57th)	Dead Man's Seat	O Lugar do Morto	António-Pedro Vasconcelos	Not nominated
1985 (58th)	Ana		Margarida Cordeiro and António Reis	Not nominated
1988 (61st)	Hard Times	Tempos Difíceis	João Botelho	Not nominated
1989 (62nd)	The Cannibals	Os Canibais	Manoel de Oliveira	Not nominated
1990 (63rd)	The King's Trial	O Processo do Rei	João Mário Grilo	Not nominated
1991 (64th)	O Sangue		Pedro Costa	Not nominated
1992 (65th)	Day of Despair	O Dia do Desespero	Manoel de Oliveira	Not nominated
1993 (66th)	Abraham's Valley	Vale Abraão	Manoel de Oliveira	Not nominated
1994 (67th)	Three Palm Trees	Três Palmeiras	João Botelho	Not nominated
1995 (68th)	God's Comedy	A Comédia de Deus	João César Monteiro	Not nominated
1997 (70th)	Voyage to the Beginning of the World	Viagem ao Princípio do Mundo	Manoel de Oliveira	Not nominated
1998 (71st)	Anxiety	Inquietude	Manoel de Oliveira	Not nominated
1999 (72nd)	The Mutants	Os Mutantes	Teresa Villaverde	Not nominated
2000 (73rd)	Too Late	Tarde Demais	José Nascimento	Not nominated
2001 (74th)	Camarate		Luís Filipe Rocha	Not nominated
2002 (75th)	O Delfim		Fernando Lopes	Not nominated
2003 (76th)	A Talking Picture	Um Filme Falado	Manoel de Oliveira	Not nominated
2004 (77th)	The Miracle According to Salomé	O Milagre segundo Salomé	Mário Barroso	Not nominated
2005 (78th)	Noite Escura		João Canijo	Not nominated
2006 (79th)	Alice		Marco Martins	Not nominated
2007 (80th)	Belle Toujours		Manoel de Oliveira	Not nominated
2008 (81st)	Our Beloved Month of August	Aquele Querido Mês de Agosto	Miguel Gomes	Not nominated
2009 (82nd)	Doomed Love	Um Amor de Perdição	Mário Barroso	Not nominated
2010 (83rd)	To Die Like a Man	Morrer Como Um Homem	João Pedro Rodrigues	Not nominated
2011 (84th)	José and Pilar	José e Pilar	Miguel Gonçalves Mendes	Not nominated
2012 (85th)	Blood of My Blood	Sangue do Meu Sangue	João Canijo	Not nominated
2013 (86th)	Lines of Wellington	Linhas de Wellington	Valeria Sarmiento	Not nominated
2014 (87th)	What Now? Remind Me	E Agora? Lembra-me	Joaquim Pinto	Not nominated
2015 (88th)	Arabian Nights: Volume 2 – The Desolate One	As Mil e Uma Noites: Volume 2, O Desolado	Miguel Gomes	Not nominated
2016 (89th)	Letters from War	Cartas da Guerra	Ivo M. Ferreira	Not nominated
2017 (90th)	Saint George	São Jorge	Marco Martins	Not nominated
2018 (91st)	Peregrinação		João Botelho	Not nominated
2019 (92nd)	The Domain	A Herdade	Tiago Guedes	Not nominated
2020 (93rd)	Vitalina Varela		Pedro Costa	Not nominated
2021 (94th)	The Metamorphosis of Birds	A Metamorfose dos Pássaros	Catarina Vasconcelos	Not nominated
2022 (95th)	Alma Viva		Cristèle Alves Meira	Not nominated
2023 (96th)	Bad Living	Mal Viver	João Canijo	Not nominated
2024 (97th)	Grand Tour		Miguel Gomes	Not nominated
2025 (98th)	Banzo		Margarida Cardoso	Not nominated
2026 (99th)	The Scent of Things Remembered	A Memória do Cheiro das Coisas	António Ferreira	Pending

== Shortlisted films ==
Each year since 2019, the Portuguese Oscar selection committee has announced a shortlist of between four and six films prior to announcing the official Portuguese Oscar candidate. The following films were shortlisted as finalists to represent Portugal in the category:

Year	Films
2019	Parque Meyer · Raiva · Variações
2020	~~Listen~~ (disqualified) · Mosquito · Patrick
2021	The Last Bath · Terra Nova · Nothing Ever Happened · Sombra · O Som Que Desce na Terra
2022	Bad Living · Remains of the Wind · Salgueiro Maia - The Implicated · Wolf & Dog
2023	Légua · Living Bad · Nayola
2024	The Buriti Flower · The Fortunate Ones · Manga d’Terra · O Teu Rosto Será o Último
2025	Dreaming of Lions · The Englishman's Papers · Hanami · Sobrevivientes
2026	18 Holes to Paradise · Dirty Land · First Person Plural · Maria Vitória · Projecto Global

== See also ==
- List of Academy Award winners and nominees for Best International Feature Film
- List of Academy Award-winning foreign language films
- Cinema of Portugal
