= List of Portuguese films of 2019 =

A list of Portuguese films that were first released in 2019.

Release date	Title	Director	Cast	Genre	Notes	Ref
January 3	The Great Mystical Circus	Carlos Diegues		Drama		
January 10	Terra Franca	Leonor Teles		Documentary		
January 17	Tiro e Queda	Ramón dos Santos		Comedy		
January 17	Os Dois Irmãos	Francisco Manso		Drama		
January 17	Wild	Dennis Berry		Drama, romance		
January 24	Uma Vida Sublime	Luís Diogo		Drama		
January 24	Debaixo do Céu	Nicholas Oulman		Documentary		
February 21	Portugal Não Está à Venda	André Badalo		Comedy		
February 28	Imagens Proibidas	Hugo Diogo		Romance		
February 28	The Portuguese Woman	Rita Azevedo Gomes		Drama		
March 7	Snu	Patrícia Sequeira		Drama, romance		
March 14	Ladrões de Tuta e Meia	Hugo Diogo		Comedy		
March 14	The Dead and the Others	João Salaviza, Renée Nader Messora		Drama		
March 21	O Homem-Pykante - Diálogos kom Pimenta	Edgar Pêra		Documentary, biography		
March 21	Gabriel	Nuno Bernardo		Drama		
April 4	Diamantino	Gabriel Abrantes, Daniel Schmidt		Comedy, fantasy		
April 18	Quero-te Tanto!	Vicente Alves do Ó		Comedy, romance		
May 1	Solum	Diogo Morgado		Action, adventure, science fiction		
May 1	Until Porn Do Us Part	Jorge Pelicano		Documentary		
May 9	Hotel Império	Ivo Ferreira		Drama		
May 16	Mar	Margarida Gil		Drama		
June 13	António Um Dois Três	Leonardo Mouramateus		Drama		
June 20	Terra	Hiroatsu Suzuki, Rossana Torres		Documentary		
June 27	Linhas Tortas	Rita Nunes		Drama		
July 25	Tony	Jorge Pelicano		Documentary, biography		
August 8	Sousa Martins: Vida e Culto	Justine Lemahieu		Documentary, biography		
August 22	Variações	João Maia		Biography, drama		
September 19	The Domain	Tiago Guedes		Drama		
September 25	Campo	Tiago Hespanha		Documentary		
September 26	Lupo	Pedro Lino		Documentary, biography		
October 3	Caminhos Magnétykos	Edgar Pêra		Drama		
October 3	Avenida Almirante Reis em Três Andamentos	Renata Sancho		Documentary		
October 10	Viriato	Luís Albuquerque		Action, drama		
October 10	Vadio – I Am Not A Poet	Stefan Lechner		Documentary		
October 17	Mutant Blast	Fernando Alle		Action, comedy, horror		
October 31	Vitalina Varela	Pedro Costa		Drama		
November 7	Technoboss	João Nicolau		Comedy, musical, romance		
November 7	Cinzas e Brasas	Manuel Mozos		Short, drama		
November 7	Bostofrio	Paulo Carneiro		Documentary		
November 21	Turno do Dia	Pedro Florêncio		Documentary		
November 21	Tristeza e Alegria na Vida das Girafas	Tiago Guedes		Adventure		
November 28	Infância, Adolescência, Juventude	Rúben Gonçalves		Documentary		
November 28	Il Sogno Mio d'Amore	Nathalie Mansoux, Miguel Moraes Cabral		Documentary		
November 28	Hálito Azul	Rodrigo Areias		Documentary		

== See also ==
- 2019 in Portugal
