= List of Portuguese films of the 2010s =

A list of films produced in Portugal in the 2010s, ordered by year of release. For an alphabetical list of Portuguese films see Category:Portuguese films.

== 2010 ==
- List of Portuguese films of 2010

== 2011 ==
- List of Portuguese films of 2011

== 2012 ==
- List of Portuguese films of 2012

== 2013 ==
- List of Portuguese films of 2013

== 2014 ==
- List of Portuguese films of 2014

== 2015 ==
- List of Portuguese films of 2015

== 2016 ==
- List of Portuguese films of 2016

== 2017 ==
- List of Portuguese films of 2017

== 2018 ==
- List of Portuguese films of 2018

== 2019 ==
- List of Portuguese films of 2019

== TBA ==
Release date	Title	Director	Cast	Genre	Notes	Ref
	A Grande Jogada	Leonel Vieira			In pre-production	
	Arabian Nights	Miguel Gomes	Crista Alfaiate, Dinarte Branco, Carloto Cotta		Completed	
	Caminhos da Alma	João Canijo			In production	
	Cinzento e Negro	Luis Filipe Rocha			In pre-production	
	Comboio de Sal e Açúcar	Licínio Azevedo			In pre-production	
	Fábrica de Nada: Entre Cinzeiros e Robots	Jorge de Silva Melo			In production	
	Gelo	Luis Galvão Teles			In post-production	
	História de Uma Surfista	Joaquim Sapinho			In pre-production	
	John From	João Nicolau			In pre-production	
	Montanha	João Salaviza			In post-production	
	No Quarto Escuro	Marco Martins			In pre-production	
	Os Senhores do Areal	Jorge António			In production	
	O Velho do Restelo	Manoel de Oliveira	Luís Miguel Cintra, Ricardo Trepa, Diogo Dória			
	Pontes de Sarajevo	Pedro Costa			In post-production	
	Posto Avançado do Progresso	Hugo Vieira da Silva			In pre-production	
	Seara de Vento	Sérgio Tréfaut			In pre-production	
	Tristes Monroes	Gabriel Abranches			In pre-production	
