= Past and Present (film) =

1972 film

- Directed by: Manoel de Oliveira
- Written by: Vicente Sanches
- Screenplay by: Vicente Sanches; Manoel de Oliveira
- Starring: Maria de Saisset; Manuela de Freitas; Bárbara Vieira
- Cinematography: Acácio de Almeida
- Release date: February 26, 1972 (Portugal)
- Country: Portugal
- Language: Portuguese

Past and Present (Portuguese: O Passado e o Presente) is a 1972 Portuguese film directed by Manoel de Oliveira. The film is considered part of the director's Tetralogy of Frustrated Love, with Benilde, Doomed Love and Francisca.

== Cast ==
- Maria de Saisset as Vanda, a widow
- Manuela de Freitas as Noémia
- Bárbara Vieira as Angélica
- Alberto Inácio as Ricardo
- Pedro Pinheiro as Firmino
- António Machado as Maurício
- Duarte de Almeida as Honório
- José Martinho as Fernando
- Alberto Branco as Doctor
- Guilhermina Pereira as Housemaid
