= Fragile as the World =

2001 Portuguese arthouse romantic drama by Rita Azevedo Gomes

- Film poster
- Directed by: Rita Azevedo Gomes
- Written by: Rita Azevedo Gomes
- Produced by: Paulo Branco
- Cinematography: Acácio de Almeida
- Edited by: Patrìcia Saramago
- Production companies: Madragoa Filmes; Gémini Films
- Distributed by: Atalanta Filmes; Gémini Films; Rádio e Televisão de Portugal
- Release date: 20 July 2001
- Countries: Portugal; France
- Languages: Portuguese; French

Fragile As The World (Portuguese: Frágil Como O Mundo) is a 2001 Portuguese arthouse romantic drama film directed and written by Rita Azevedo Gomes and produced by Paulo Branco. Starred by Maria Gonçalves and Bruno Terra. The story follows two young people in love, Vera and João who run away from home and isolate themselves in a forest, promising never to be separated. The film premiered in Portugal on 20 July 2001.

== Plot ==
Vera and João are two teenagers in love. Apparently, their life does not present them with any problems. They both have family and friends who love them. As the teenagers that they are, their whole life has been defined by others. The couple feels they have no space, and especially no time, to live their passion. Besides being busy with their studies, their homes are far apart. But the biggest problem is that they feel that their own time does not allow them to love each other.

Trying to define their future, Vera and João start an escape plan. With the same innocence with which they participate in a children's game, they flee from their homes, and move away from their land. The couple isolates themselves in a forest. There, they make a pact: they will never be separated "for anything in this world."

Vera tells João a secret that she had never revealed even to her family. She describes an experience, memory or imagination, from when she was a child. She found herself in danger, trapped in a place with no way out. With all her faith, Vera asked Mother Nature to open a crack that would allow her to get out of there. A giant rock moves, freeing her. Upon hearing the story, João believes her.

A bond of complicity between the couple and union with the Nature of the forest gradually becomes more intense. But Vera, on the other hand, begins to feel weaker and eventually falls ill. João finds himself in a dilemma: on the one hand, he does not want to break the pact that they will not be separated "for anything in this world," but on the other, he wants to leave her alone to go for help.

He carries her and they lay on a boat. Many years later, a child sees them laying in the boat, she suspects they're dead but cannot confirm. The child tells her mother and she tells her to go to sleep.

== Cast ==
- Maria Gonçalves as Vera
- Bruno Terra as João
- Mário Barroso as Narrator
- Sophie Balabanian as Mãe de Vera
- Carlos Ferreira as Pai de Vera
- Manuela de Freitas as Avó
- João Bénard da Costa as Avô (as Duarte de Almeida)
- Carolina Villaverde as Luzinha
- Maria Celestino da Costa as Vera Menina
- Nuno Nunes as Irmão de Vera
- Marta Costa as Amiga de Vera

== Production ==
=== Development ===
Gomez became interested in the concept of the film after reading an article in 1993 about the suicide of a couple. In her words:

A boy and a girl, found dead very composed, lying without signs of violence, in the shade of a holm oak tree, in a field in Alentejo. It was one of those stories that nobody understood, two children who kill themselves. How did they die? Because, apparently, everything was fine in their lives and nothing suggested that they would do it.

When developing the story into a screenplay, Azevedo Gomes integrated fragments of literary texts by poets like Agustina Bessa-Luís, Cecília Meireles, Luís Vaz de Camões, Rainer Maria Rilke, and Sophia de Mello Breyner Andresen, whose verse "Terror de te amar num sítio tão frágil como o mundo", from the poem Terror de Te Amar, gives the film its title. In addition to these literary inspirations, particularly for the protagonist's grandfather, used references from the cinema of Carl Theodor Dreyer.

With small production means, Gomes started the preparation of "Fragile Like the World" on her own. When Paulo Branco joined the project, most of the pre-production (such as casting, retakes, and props) had already been done by the director. About recording locations, Gomez recalls that "I used to talk to forestry service directors - and everything in Sintra is paid for at the price of gold, and I didn't pay a penny, Paulo didn't pay a penny, because I did everything myself, (...) I got all the décors there for free".

=== Filming ===
The filming took place in the Lisbon Metropolitan Area, for example, in places like Sintra and Vila Franca de Xira. Throughout the shooting process, there were several constraints, namely between the director and members of the production. The sound direction was dependent on the availability of the technicians. This forced several scenes to be recorded without direct sound or even use sound.

=== Post-production ===
The filmmaker's intense involvement extended into the post-production phase. Besides the transition to black and white, the lack of direct sound forced the dubbing of the characters by the actors and the subsequent composition of environmental sounds. In her words:

I even made music for Frágil como o Mundo, I went with some bubbles, glass and cataplanas to make some sounds that I needed, mixed with violins, and it was very funny because I was alone recording, I would go to Sintra at three in the morning and carry a DAT

The sound problems also triggered new dialogue rewrites, in addition to the inclusion of a poem, Menina e Moça, by Bernardim Ribeiro, which led to the invitation to filmmaker Mário Barroso to interpret it as narrator.

== Themes ==
For Gomez, cinema is the territory of communion of poetry, of reality or memory, of nature and dream: "cinema is the right place to represent the coexistence of stones and ghosts". In this way, Fragile as the World starts from a premise of a children's fable and Shakespearian tragedy, but takes a modern approach to image and sound. In fact, something characteristic of the cinema of Rita Azevedo Gomes, the film results from a fusion of imaginary legends and literary references that, in this case, enhance the romantic elements of the work, about impossible love, the perishability of the body, the communion with nature, and the perception of human fragility. Besides the poetry in evidence, music and painting are elements included in Fragile Like the World that reinforce all this symbolism. The work also makes use of the literary voice as an additional layer: "the narration works a bit like music. But music is an abstract thing and voice, on the contrary, its able to make the image subjective. In other words, while the camera makes the image objective, by bringing (...) an image closer to reality, the narration makes them subjective".

The film also stands out for the careful composition of the shots, for a lethargy in acting and action, but also for the oneiric simplicity of the scenarios. In fact, the fog assumes preponderance throughout the work, taking over the image, in an omen that anticipates the fate of the protagonists. All this imagetic charge of the film places it in a timeless universe, which is neither purely classical nor contemporary cinema.

The filmmaker justified the option for the softened black-and-white image as an attempt to unite all the realities, memories, and fantasies evoked throughout the narrative. Even so, as a contrast, there are some shots in color, such as the initial panorama in a ruined house that refers to a forgotten memory. In the second half of the film, a flashback to a forest again introduces color to the work, giving the place an enchanted component and suggesting that the scene may result not only from memory, but also from imagination. Although the sequence is interrupted by black and white, the image resumes coloration when the camera reveals the unrealistic tones of the forest and the specters around the couple.

== Release ==
Frágil como o Mundo was released in Portugal by Atalanta Filmes, having its premiere on July 20, 2001, in the King (Lisbon) and Charlot (Oporto) cinemas. Atalanta Filmes would also publish Fragile as the World in VHS. In France, the film hit the theaters on August 25, 2002, through Gémini Films.
