= Luís Lucas =

Portuguese actor (1952–2025)

Luís Filipe de Almeida Lucas (16 June 1952 – 24 August 2025) was a Portuguese actor.

== Life and career ==
Lucas spent his childhood in Cartaxo, where his father owned the local pharmacy. He attended the Higher Education Course for Actors. He was a founding member of the group Comuna - Teatro de Pesquisa, with which he participated in several international theater festivals. He also worked in the groups: Cómicos, Teatro da Cornucopia (1977), Produções Teatrais Lda., Teatro da Graça and Projecto Intercidades.

He starred in a number of feature films throughout his career, including: Alexandre e Rosa (1978) by João Botelho, Passagem ou Meio Caminho (1980) by Jorge Silva Melo, Dina and Django (1981) by Solveig Nordlund Niguém Duas Vezes (1984) by Jorge Silva Melo, Le Soulier de Satin (1985) by Manoel de Oliveira, Notre Marriage (1984) by Valeria Sarmiento, Das Autogramm (1984) by Peter Lilienthal, Um Adeus Portuguese (1986) by João Botelho, Saudadades para Dona Genciana (1986) by Eduardo Geada, O Bobo (1987) by José Álvaro Morais, Non ou a Vã Glória de Mandar (1990) by Manoel de Oliveira, Rosa Negra (1982) by Margarida Gil, Longe da Vista (1998), Aqui na Terra (1993), Camarate (2001) and A Passagem da Noite (2002), Dot.com (2007), and Suicide Commissioned (2007).

Lucas participated in dozens of Portuguese and foreign series, mini-series, telefilms and soap operas, such as Duarte e Companhia Cinzas, Riscos, Médico de Família, Jornalistas, O Bairro da Fonte, Querido Professor, Ganância, Um Estranho em Casa, Fúria de Viver, O Olhar da Serpente. Une Famille Formidable, See You Tomorrow Comrades, Ecuador, Let It Take You, Perfect Heart, Republic, Liberty 21, And After the Farewell, Odysseus, Our Days, The Kiss of the Scorpion or Heart of Gold. Between 2007 and 2011 he was the narrator of the series Conta-me Como Foi.

Lucas died at Santa Marta Hospital on 24 August 2025, at the age of 73, following a heart attack.
