= Glória (2021 TV series) =

Portuguese television series

- Release poster
- Genre: Drama; Thriller; History
- Created by: Pedro Lopes
- Written by: Inês Gomes; Pedro Lopes; Rita Roberto; Filipa Poppe; Miguel Simal; André Tenente; Manuel Mora Marques; Mafalda Cordeiro; Mário Cunha; Marina Ribeiro
- Directed by: Tiago Guedes
- Starring: Miguel Nunes; Matt Rippy; Stephanie Vogt; Rafael Morais; Carolina Amaral; Alfonso Pimentel; Victoria Guerra; Adriano Luz; Augusto Madeira; Leonor Silveira; Ana Neborac; João Pedro Vaz; João Arrais; Marcello Urgeghe; Maria João Pinho; Jimmy Taenaka
- Composer: Bruno Pernadas
- Country of origin: Portugal
- Original languages: Portuguese, English
- No. of seasons: 1
- No. of episodes: 10

Production
- Producer: Sérgio Baptista
- Production location: Portugal
- Cinematography: André Szankowski
- Editor: Marcos Castiel
- Running time: 40-47 minutes
- Production companies: RTP2; Rádio e Televisão de Portugal; SP Televisão; SPi, SA

Original release
- Network: Netflix
- Release: 5 November 2021

Glória is a Portuguese historical thriller drama television series. It was released on 5 November 2021 and is the first Netflix production originating in Portugal. It tells the story of a young spy operating in Cold-War Portugal, amid the intrigues of the US and Soviet Union. According to Variety, the show cost 6 million euros to produce, making it the most expensive series in Portuguese television history. (Note: The previous record belonged to the series Equador, produced in 2008 by TVI, costing 5.7 million euros.)

== Synopsis ==
In the small village of Glória do Ribatejo, João Vidal is recruited as a spy for the KGB. It is the 1960s, at the height of the Cold War, and both the Soviets and Americans are attempting to manipulate events to their respective advantage and gain strategic control of Europe. Vidal undertakes high-risk espionage missions that have the potential to change the course of Portuguese and world history.

== Cast and characters ==
=== Main ===
Actor/Actress	Character
Miguel Nunes	João Vidal
Matt Rippy	James Wilson
Stephanie Vogt	Anne O'Brien Wilson
Carolina Amaral	Carolina
Afonso Pimentel	Gonçalo
Victória Guerra	Mia
Adriano Luz	Alexandre Petrovsky
Augusto Madeira	Miguel
Leonor Silveira	Madalena Vidal
Ana Neborac	Irina
João Pedro Vaz	Ramiro
João Arrais	Fernando
Marcello Urgeghe	Henrique Vidal
Maria João Pinho	Sofia
Jimmy Taenaka	Bill

=== Recurring ===
Actor/Actress	Character
Adriano Carvalho	Tomé
Fernando Pires	Hernâni
João Estima	Bernardino
Sílvia Filipe	Vitalina
Luís Araújo	Elias
Rita Durão	Nazaré
Rodrigo Tomás	Mário
Sandra Faleiro	Ermelinda
Carloto Cotta	Brito
Tónan Quito	Luís
Rafael Morais	Domingos
Ana Sofia Martins	Theresa
Cláudio da Silva	Horácio
Álvaro Correia	Padre Martinho
Jorge Andrade	Jaime Ramos
João Pedro Mamede	Zé Mudo
Gonçalo Waddington	César
Jim Sturgeon	Ronald Parker
Vicente Gil	Roberto
Rita Cabaço	Otília
Teresa Madruga	Alcina
Stewart Alexander	Ambassador Ryan Marshal
Joana Ribeiro	Ursula
Albano Jerónimo	Dassaev
Pepê Rapazote	Embaixador Americano
Inês Castel-Branco	Enfermeira Lourdes

== Episodes ==
No. overall	No. in season	Title	Directed by	Written by	Original release date
1	1	"Rumo à Vitória" "Onwards to Victory"	Tiago Guedes	Mafalda Cordeiro, Mário Cunha, Inês Gomes, Pedro Lopes, Marina Ribeiro, Rita Roberto	5 November 2021
It is 1968, on the eve of the Soviet invasion of Czechoslovakia, and João Vidal takes up his new post at RARET, an American intelligence operation in the small town of Glória do Ribatejo. Unbeknownst to his colleagues, however, Vidal has been recruited by the Soviets to act as a spy.
2	2	"A Absolvição Absolve-nos da Culpa" "Confession Absolves Us of Any Guilt"	Tiago Guedes	Inês Gomes, Pedro Lopes, Filipa Poppe, Rita Roberto, Miguel Simal, André Tenente	5 November 2021
3	3	"A Pátria Não Se Discute" "We Do Not Discuss the Nation"	Tiago Guedes	Mafalda Cordeiro, Mário Cunha, Inês Gomes, Pedro Lopes, Marina Ribeiro	5 November 2021
4	4	"A Morte Nunca é Natural" "Death Is Never Natural"	Tiago Guedes	Inês Gomes, Pedro Lopes, Filipa Poppe, Rita Roberto, Miguel Simal, André Tenente	5 November 2021
5	5	"Olhar a Lua de Baixo" "Looking at the Moon from Below"	Tiago Guedes	Inês Gomes, Pedro Lopes, Filipa Poppe, Rita Roberto, Miguel Simal, André Tenente	5 November 2021
6	6	"O Infortúnio" "The Misfortune"	Tiago Guedes	Inês Gomes, Pedro Lopes, Manuel Mora Marques, Filipa Poppe, Rita Roberto, Miguel Simal, André Tenente	5 November 2021
7	7	"A Fuga..." "The Leak"	Tiago Guedes	Inês Gomes, Pedro Lopes, Manuel Mora Marques, Filipa Poppe, Rita Roberto, Miguel Simal, André Tenente	5 November 2021
8	8	"Virtudes Públicas" "Public Virtues"	Tiago Guedes	Inês Gomes, Pedro Lopes, Manuel Mora Marques, Filipa Poppe, Rita Roberto, Miguel Simal, André Tenente	5 November 2021
9	9	"A Toupeira" "The Mole"	Tiago Guedes	Inês Gomes, Pedro Lopes, Manuel Mora Marques, Filipa Poppe, Rita Roberto, Miguel Simal, André Tenente	5 November 2021
10	10	"Homem Novo" "New Man"	Tiago Guedes	Inês Gomes, Pedro Lopes, Manuel Mora Marques, Filipa Poppe, Rita Roberto, Miguel Simal, André Tenente	5 November 2021
