= Visit or Memories and Confessions =

- Film poster
- Portuguese: Visita ou Memórias e Confissões
- Directed by: Manoel de Oliveira
- Written by: Manoel de Oliveira; Agustina Bessa-Luis
- Produced by: Manoel de Oliveira
- Cinematography: Elso Roque
- Edited by: Manoel de Oliveira; Ana Luisa Guimaraes
- Release date: 4 May 2015
- Running time: 68 minutes
- Country: Portugal
- Language: Portuguese

Visit or Memories and Confessions (Portuguese: Visita ou Memórias e Confissões) is a Portuguese documentary film directed by Manoel de Oliveira. It was released in Portugal on 4 May 2015.

== Cast ==
- Manoel de Oliveira
- Maria Oliveira
- Urbano Tavares Rodrigues
- Teresa Madruga (voice)
- Diogo Doria (voice)

== Production ==
The film was shot in 1982.

== Reception ==
Deborah Young of The Hollywood Reporter called it "a posthumous little jewel for Oliveira admirers."
