= Day of Despair =

- Directed by: Manoel de Oliveira
- Written by: Manoel de Oliveira
- Produced by: Paulo Branco
- Starring: Mário Barroso; Luís Miguel Cintra; Teresa Madruga
- Cinematography: Mário Barroso
- Edited by: Valérie Loiseleux; Manoel de Oliveira
- Release date: 30 October 1992
- Running time: 75 minutes
- Countries: France; Portugal
- Language: Portuguese

Day of Despair (Portuguese: O Dia do Desespero) is a 1992 Portuguese drama film based on the life of Portuguese writer Camilo Castelo Branco. It was directed by Manoel de Oliveira. The film was selected as the Portuguese entry for the Best Foreign Language Film at the 65th Academy Awards, but was not accepted as a nominee.

== Cast ==
- Mário Barroso as Camilo Castelo Branco
- Teresa Madruga as Ana Plácido
- Luís Miguel Cintra as Freitas Fortuna
- Diogo Dória as Dr. Edmundo Magalhães

== Reception ==
The film has been considered "unjustly overlooked and underrated".

== See also ==
- List of submissions to the 65th Academy Awards for Best Foreign Language Film
- List of Portuguese submissions for the Academy Award for Best Foreign Language Film
