= The Domain =

The Domain may refer to:

- The Domain (Austin, Texas), a shopping mall
- The Domain (film), a 2019 Portuguese film
- The Domain, Sydney, a park
- Queens Domain, also known as The Domain, a park in Hobart

== See also ==
- Domain (disambiguation)
