= The Convent (1995 film) =

The Convent (O Convento)
- Directed by: Manoel de Oliveira
- Written by: Manoel de Oliveira
- Based on: As terras do risco by Agustina Bessa-Luís
- Produced by: Paulo Branco
- Starring: Catherine Deneuve; John Malkovich
- Cinematography: Mario Barroso
- Music by: Sofia Gubaidulina Igor Stravinsky Toshiro Mayuzumi
- Distributed by: Atalanta Filmes
- Release date: 1995
- Running time: 90 minutes
- Countries: Portugal; France
- Languages: French; English; Portuguese
- Budget: $4,300,000
- Box office: $367,585

The Convent (Portuguese: O Convento) is a 1995 mystery drama film by Portuguese director Manoel de Oliveira, starring Catherine Deneuve and John Malkovich and is inspired by an original idea by Agustina Bessa-Luís in her novel As terras do risco. It was entered into the main competition of the 1995 Cannes Film Festival.

== Plot ==
The film opens when a Paris-based American professor Michael Padovic and his elegant French wife Hélène arrive at an ancient Portuguese convent in Arrábida where he believes the documents needed to prove his theory might be in its archives: Shakespeare was born in Spain named Jacques Perez, and was Jewish.

The couple is greeted by an enigmatic stranger who refers to himself as Baltar; he is the guardian of the monastery. Baltar introduced them to Berta, the housekeeper and his assistant Baltazar. For his research work, Padovic spends most of his days in the library with the beautiful librarian Piedade, while Hélène is accompanied by Baltar who eventually professes his love towards the elegant lady.

As the tension increases to its dramatic climax, the film ends with an epilogue in the form of on-screen text from a fisherman's report. Baltar and Piedade went missing after a forest fire; Michael and Hélène "left immediately" and are leading a normal life in Paris; Michael abandoned his research on Jacques Perez and is studying occult sciences instead. It nevertheless warns the audience that the fisherman's report might not be reliable.

== Cast ==
- Catherine Deneuve as Hélène
- John Malkovich as Michael Padovic
- Luís Miguel Cintra as Baltar
- Leonor Silveira as Piedade
- Duarte de Almeida as Baltazar
- Heloísa Miranda as Berta
- Gilberto Gonçalves as Fisherman

== Music ==
The film centers at the question of Evil vs Good and Devil vs God. Essential to the brooding atmosphere is Oliveira's choice of music by Sofia Gubaidulina (Offertorium, Sieben Worte), and portions of Igor Stravinsky’s “The Rake’s Progress” and Toshiro Mayuzumi’s “Prelude, for String Quartet.”

== Reception ==
In Portugal, the film was the most popular Portuguese film in 1995 with admissions of 35,000. It received positive reviews in the U.S. from Los Angeles Times, New York Times and Chicago Reader.
