= Villa Myosótis =

Villa Myosótis is a residential building located in Póvoa de Varzim, Portugal. It is located at Avenida Mousinho de Albuquerque, 140.

The building has multiple apartments, where the notable Portuguese writer Agustina Bessa-Luís lived during her early teenager years, a period when she developed her writing style, while studying in nearby Colégio do Sagrado Coração de Jesus. The building started being built when the city hall approved the project on May 26, 1925. It was restored in early 2000s.

Villa Myosótis has a Portuguese modernist style. It is a building with a vertical dominance, three floors, basement and full use of the attic. Of masonry construction, the façade is noted by the platforms projecting from the wall of the building, yellow painted frames, decorated azulejo panels with Art Nouveau influence and the colonnade of the second and third floors.
