= Kobena =

Kobena is both a given name and a surname. Notable people with the name include:

- Kobena Eyi Acquah (born 1952), Ghanaian lawyer
- Kobena Amed (born 1997), Ivorian footballer
- Kobena Mercer (born 1960), British art historian
- Nouhoum Kobéna (born 1985), Beninese footballer
- Robert Kobena Dentu, Ghanaian minister
