= Puberty (Munch) =

Painting by Edvard Munch

- Pubertet (Norwegian)
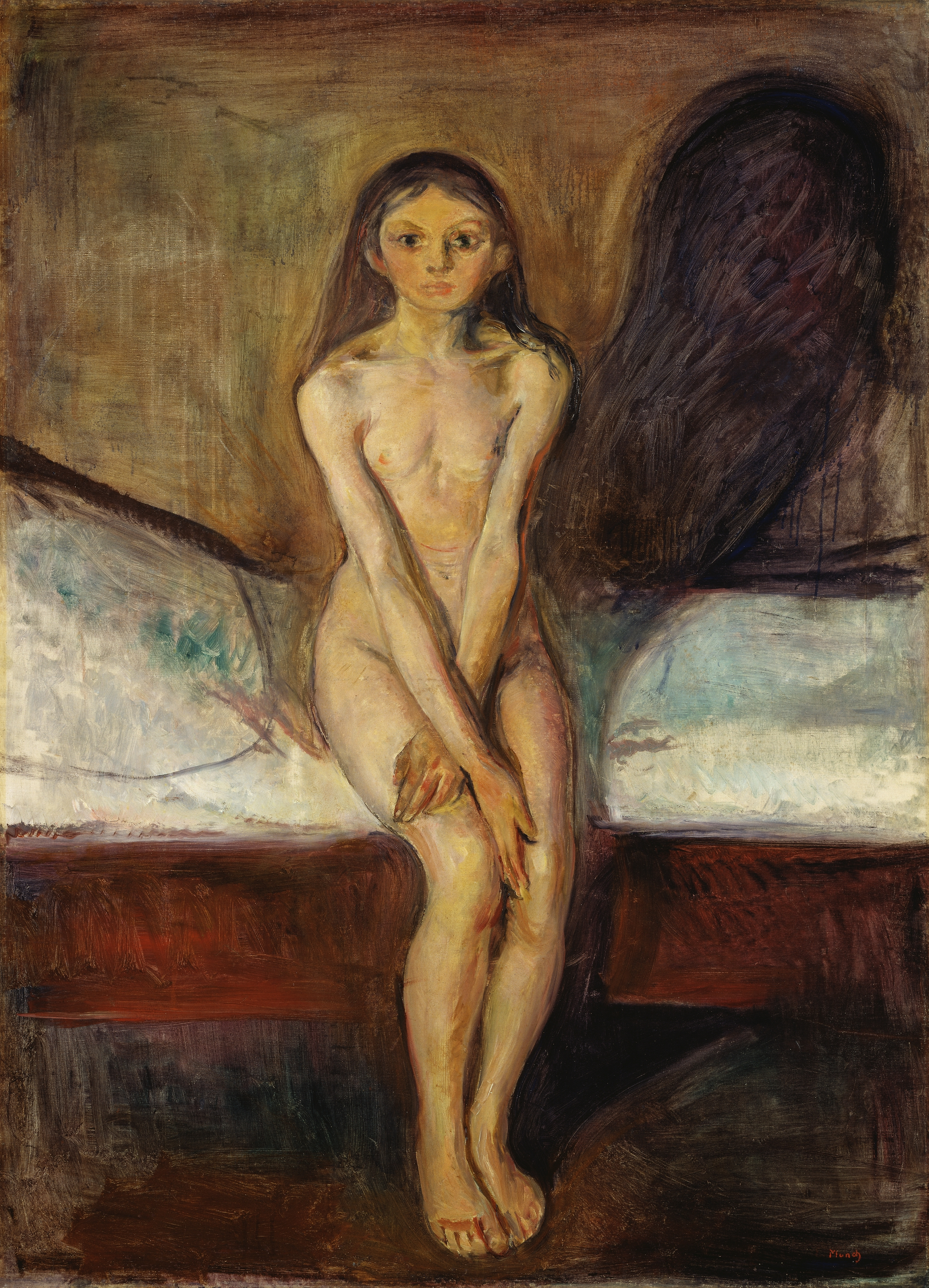
- Artist: Edvard Munch
- Year: 1894-1895
- Medium: Oil on canvas
- Dimensions: 151.5 cm × 110 cm (59 5/8 in × 43 3/8 in)
- Location: National Gallery, Oslo

Puberty (Norwegian: Pubertet) is an 1894–95 painting created by Norwegian artist Edvard Munch. Puberty has associations with both symbolism and expressionism, the former a movement from which Munch emerged, and the latter a movement in which Munch was pivotal. It is part of an informal series or cycle of paintings, prints, and images known as The Frieze of Life, that Munch created in the 1890s, although he often revisited and explored themes and images from the series throughout his career. The painting was also done as a lithograph and an etching by Munch.

== Inspiration ==
=== Rops' illustration ===
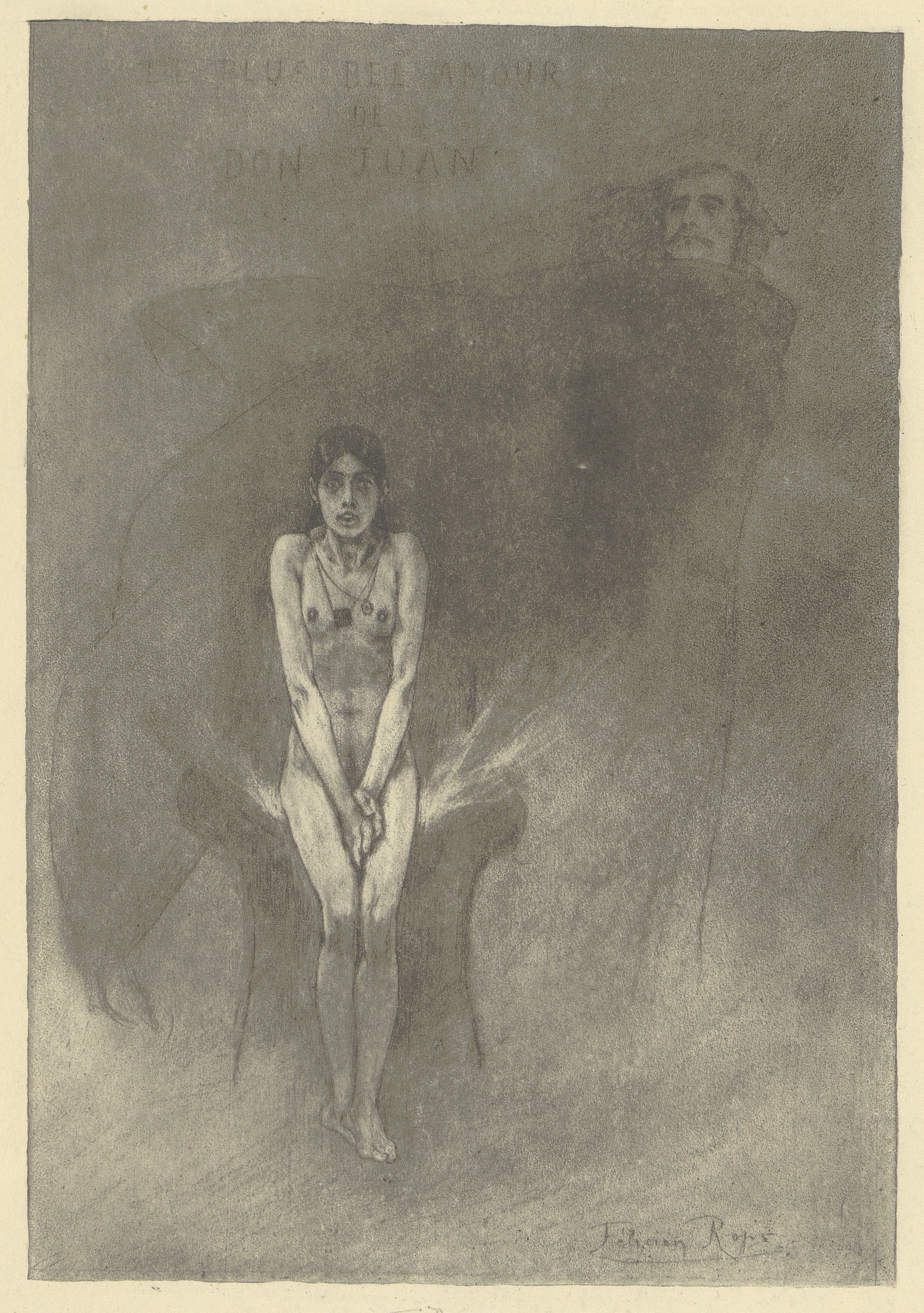
Félicien Rops, Le Plus Bel Amour De Don Juan, 1882.

Whenever he was questioned on the subject, Munch maintained he had not been influenced by the work of the Belgium artist and illustrator Félicien Rops, specifically the etching Le Plus Bel Amour De Don Juan [Don Juan's Greatest Love], which was published as an illustration in the second edition of Jules Amédée Barbey d’Aurevilly's book Les Diaboliques in 1882 (based on an earlier 1879 pencil drawing).) However, art critics and historians have consistently noted the similarities; beginning with Przybyszewski (1894) the first publication devoted to Munch.

Munch himself claimed that his 1894–95 painting was a copy of an earlier painting he first made in 1885 or 1886 and "that this earlier version had been lost in a studio fire".

Norwegian art historian Arne Eggum, in commentary published by The Masterworks of Edvard Munch regarding Munch's Puberty, said that the images were so similar, that Munch found it necessary to claim he did not wish to replicate Félicien Rops' 1886 Le Plus Bel Amour De Don Juan. [Although Eggum was in error; the 2nd ed. of Les Diaboliques with Rops etching, was published in 1882, not 1886].

=== Sexual depression ===
In the late 1880s and into the mid-1890s, Munch, in his mid-twenties, had begun to create his series of Puberty pieces. At this time Munch had already established himself as a notable artist in Berlin. During this period of his life Munch often found residence in Berlin, where his newfound fame and circle of friends were. His new group of friends are attributed for helping push Munch further into his sexually depressed state of mind.

Munch – like the female portrayed in Puberty – feared sex due to the loss of his virginity to his cousin's wife. Munch allowed this sexual depression to seep into Puberty and like other later works this piece was created with symbolism reflecting feelings which continued growing increasingly within the next ten years. This state of sexual depression is one that not only his circle of friends shared with him, but that the psychological scholars had also been curious about having just written the first research on the stages and occurrences of puberty in young adults.

== Subject and title ==
Munch, At Night (Puberty), 1902

Munch's painting Puberty depicts a young naked girl sitting on the edge of a bed. Her legs are pressed together. She holds her hands in front of her body; one lies between her knees, while the other rests on her right thigh. She stares straight ahead with eyes wide open. Her mouth is closed and her long hair hangs down over and behind the shoulders. The light enters from the left, and behind her a dark, ominous shadow is visible.

The motif is often regarded as a symbol of anxiety and fear, a young girl's awakening sexuality and the changes a young person experiences physically and psychologically on the path towards adulthood.

Munch gave a number of titles to various versions of the motif, originally The Young Model, later Puberty, and still later At Night. "The image can thus sustain various interpretations, from a view of a model by an artist to an evocation of nocturnal sensual pleasures and terrors."

== Reaction ==
Puberty is considered a critical spark towards the progress of Munch's personal emotional journey in how he portrayed his feelings in his artwork.

== See also ==
- List of paintings by Edvard Munch
