= Les Diaboliques =

Les Diaboliques may refer to:

- Les Diaboliques (book), 1874 short stories collection by Jules Amédée Barbey d'Aurevilly, each of which relates a tale of a woman who commits acts of violence, crime, or revenge
- Les Diaboliques (film), 1955 French film directed by Henri-Georges Clouzot, based on a novel by Boileau-Narcejac
- Diabolique (1996 film), 1996 U.S. film, remake of 1955 film
- Les Diaboliques (band), trio founded by Scottish vocalist Maggie Nicols, Swiss pianist Irene Schweizer and French bassist Joelle Leandre
