= The Portuguese Woman =

2018 film directed by Rita Azevedo Gomes

- Directed by: Rita Azevedo Gomes
- Written by: Rita Azevedo Gomes; Agustina Bessa-Luís
- Based on: The Portuguese Lady by Robert Musil
- Produced by: Gonzalo García Pelayo; Rita Azevedo Gomes
- Starring: Clara Riedenstein
- Cinematography: Acácio de Almeida
- Edited by: Rita Azevedo Gomes
- Music by: José Mário Branco
- Release dates: 2 November 2018 (Mar del Plata); 28 February 2019
- Running time: 136 minutes
- Country: Portugal
- Language: Portuguese

The Portuguese Woman (Portuguese: A Portuguesa) is a 2018 Portuguese drama film directed by Rita Azevedo Gomes and starring Clara Riedenstein.

== Plot ==
In the 16th century, a Portuguese noblewoman waits for a decade for her husband to return from war in Italy. She eventually welcomes back the now disillusioned and jealous man.

== Cast ==
- Clara Riedenstein as A Portuguesa
- Marcello Urgeghe as Von Ketten
- Ingrid Caven as Passageira
- Rita Durão as Escrava Moura
- Pierre Léon as Velho Criado
- João Vicente as Pero Lobato
- Luna Picoli-Truffaut as Antonie
- Manuela de Freitas as Vidente
- Alexandre Alves Costa as Bispo de Trento
- Fernando Rodrigues as Ferrant
- Guilherme Gomes as Renart

== Production ==
The film is based on the novella The Portuguese Lady by Robert Musil. Rita Azevedo Gomes became interested in it after the writer Agustina Bessa-Luís made a reference to it and they began to talk about Musil and the story. Azevedo Gomes asked Bessa-Luís if she wanted to write a screenplay based on the story, which she accepted.

== Release ==
The film premiered at the 2018 Mar del Plata International Film Festival. It had a festival run that included the Forum section of the 69th Berlin International Film Festival. It was released theatrically in Lisbon on 28 February 2019.

== Reception ==
Stephen Dalton of The Hollywood Reporter described The Portuguese Woman as a film with "painterly visuals and highbrow pedigree" that "often plods even during its most potentially gripping moments". Peter Bradshaw of The Guardian called it "uncompromisingly andante" due to its reliance on static shots, tableaux and elaborate visual details. He described it as "elegant, mysterious, implacably distant slow cinema, beautiful but opaque, composed on the stately level of the court masque, and with a delicate, if not precisely subtle, flavour of eroticism".
