= Don Giovanni (1970 film) =

- DVD cover
- Directed by: Carmelo Bene
- Screenplay by: Carmelo Bene
- Based on: "The Greatest Love of Don Juan" by Jules Barbey d'Aurevilly
- Produced by: Carmelo Bene
- Cinematography: Mario Masini
- Edited by: Mauro Contini
- Release date: May 1970 (Directors' Fortnight)
- Running time: 85 minutes
- Country: Italy
- Languages: Italian; English

Don Giovanni is a 1970 Italian comedy-drama film directed by Carmelo Bene. The narrative follows how Don Giovanni tries to seduce a young woman who is manically searching for Christian icons. The film is loosely based on Jules Barbey d'Aurevilly's short story "The Greatest Love of Don Juan", from the collection Les Diaboliques.

The film premiered in the Directors' Fortnight section of the 1970 Cannes Film Festival.

== Cast ==
- Carmelo Bene as Don Giovanni
- Lydia Mancinelli as Mother
- Vittorio Bodini as Father
- Gea Marotta as Girl
- John Francis Lane as Narrator
- Salvatore Vendittelli as Commander
