= The Hunt (1963 film) =

- Directed by: Manoel de Oliveira
- Written by: Manoel de Oliveira
- Produced by: Manoel de Oliveira
- Starring: António Rodrigues Sousa; João Rocha Almeida
- Cinematography: Manoel de Oliveira
- Edited by: Manoel de Oliveira
- Release date: 1963
- Running time: 21 min
- Country: Portugal
- Language: Portuguese

The Hunt (Portuguese: A Caça) is a 1963 short Portuguese film directed by Manoel de Oliveira. The film is a grim, surrealistic short narrative film that contrasted with the positive tones of Oliveira's previous film. Due to censorship issues, Oliveira was forced to add a "happy ending" to the initial release of the film and was unable to restore his original ending until 1988. Because of this film and anti- Salazar regime comments Oliveira made after a screening of his previous film O Acto de Primavera, he was arrested by the PIDE in 1963. He spent 10 days in jail and was interrogated until finally being released with the help of his friend Manuel Meneres.

== Cast ==
- António Rodrigues Sousa as José
- João Rocha Almeida as Roberto
- Albino Freitas as Sapateiro, shoe-maker
- Manuel De Sa as Maneta, one-handed man
