= Les Diaboliques (short story collection) =

Collection of short stories

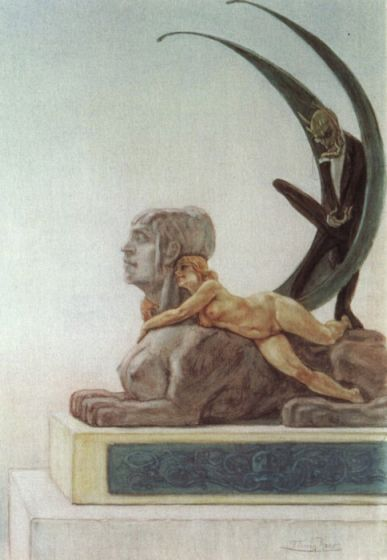
- Original frontispiece by Félicien Rops
- Author: Barbey d'Aurevilly
- Original title: Les Diaboliques
- Language: French
- Publisher: Dentu
- Publication date: November 1874
- Publication place: France
- Pages: 354

Les Diaboliques (The She-Devils) is a collection of short stories written by Barbey d'Aurevilly and published in France in 1874. Each story features a woman who commits an act of violence, or revenge, or some other crime. It is considered d'Aurevilly's masterpiece.

D'Aurevilly, due to the boredom induced by bourgeois life in the French Second Republic, was a dandy. Similarly, the acts committed by the characters in these stories are induced not only by their extreme passion but also by their boredom. Some of the characters spend hours playing whist while others take delight in wearing fine clothes. All of the female characters are best at concealing their passions and are strong, independent instigators.

D'Aurevilly uses récit parlé, a bracketing narrative, as a structural tool for five of the six short stories.

== Content ==
- "The Crimson Curtain": An old vicomte tells a younger friend about his first sexual experience with a woman.
- "The Greatest Love of Don Juan": An aged playboy, surrounded by past lovers, relates the tale of his greatest love affair.
- "Happiness in Crime": A comte falls in love with a skilled fencer and hires her as his wife's maid.
- "Beneath the Cards of a Game of Whist": The secret affair of a lady and an expert whist player leads to an horrific act.
- "At a Dinner of Atheists": A French officer relates a tale of love and lust with the wife of one of his fellow officers.
- "A Woman's Revenge": A wealthy princess spurns her ignoble husband by becoming a cheap prostitute.

In the appendix, he included:

- "A Page From History--1606": a recount of the incestuous romance between Julien and Marguerite de Ravalet, during the late Wars of Religion and the early reign of Henri IV.

== Publication ==
D'Aurevilly wrote "The Crimson Curtain" in 1866. "The Greatest Love of Don Juan" followed in 1867. In 1870, d'Aurevilly retired to the Cotentin Peninsula and finished the collection.

When the collection was first published in France in 1874, it caused up an uproar with the French public and the work was declared a danger to public morality and the Public Prosecutor issued orders for its seizure on the grounds of blasphemy and obscenity. D'Aurevilly defended the work, albeit tongue-in-cheek, by saying that he himself was a Christian and the stories demonstrated the battle of good against evil.

A second edition was published in 1882.

== English translations ==
- Weird Women, trans. unknown (Lutetian Bibliophiles' Society, 1900)
- The Diaboliques, trans. Ernest Boyd (Knopf, 1925; Dedalus Books, 1986)
- The She-Devils (Les Diaboliques), trans. Jean Kimber (Oxford University Press, 1964)
- Diaboliques: Six Tales of Decadence, trans. Raymond N. MacKenzie (University of Minnesota Press, 2015)

== Film adaptations ==
- A Woman's Revenge (1921), directed by Robert Wiene, based on "A Woman's Revenge"
- The Crimson Curtain (1953), directed by Alexandre Astruc, based on "The Crimson Curtain"
- Hauteclaire (1961 film), by Jean Prat (filmmaker), based on Le bonheur est dans le crime
- Don Giovanni (1970), directed by Carmelo Bene, based on "The Greatest Love of Don Juan"
- A Vingança de uma Mulher (2012), directed by Rita Azevedo Gomes, based on "A Woman's Revenge"
