= A Woman's Revenge (2012 film) =

- Portuguese: A Vingança de uma Mulher
- Directed by: Rita Azevedo Gomes
- Written by: Rita Azevedo Gomes
- Based on: La Vengeance d'une femme from Les Diaboliques by Jules Amédée Barbey d'Aurevilly
- Starring: Rita Durão; Fernando Rodrigues
- Cinematography: Acácio de Almeida
- Edited by: Patrícia Saramago
- Release date: March 29, 2012 (Portugal)
- Running time: 100 minutes
- Country: Portugal
- Language: Portuguese

A Woman's Revenge (Portuguese: A Vingança de uma Mulher) is a 2012 Portuguese film directed by Rita Azevedo Gomes.

== Cast ==
- Rita Durão
- Fernando Rodrigues as Roberto
