= Three Palm Trees =

- Directed by: João Botelho
- Written by: João Botelho
- Starring: Teresa Roby
- Release date: 5 May 1994
- Running time: 105 minutes
- Country: Portugal
- Language: Portuguese

Three Palm Trees (Portuguese: Três Palmeiras) is a 1994 Portuguese film by João Botelho. It was screened at the Directors' Fortnight in Cannes. The film was selected as the Portuguese entry for the Best Foreign Language Film at the 67th Academy Awards, but was not accepted as a nominee.

== See also ==
- List of submissions to the 67th Academy Awards for Best Foreign Language Film
- List of Portuguese submissions for the Academy Award for Best Foreign Language Film
