= Dentu =

Dentu is a surname. Notable people with the surname include:

- Robert Kobena Dentu, Ghanaian minister
- Jean-François-Auguste Le Dentu (1841–1926), French surgeon
