= Traffic (1998 film) =

1998 comedy film

- Directed by: João Botelho
- Screenplay by: João Botelho
- Produced by: Paulo Branco
- Starring: Joaquim Oliveira; Rita Blanco; Adriano Luz
- Cinematography: Olivier Guéneau
- Edited by: Rudolfo Wedeles
- Release date: 1998
- Language: Portuguese

Traffic (Portuguese: Tráfico) is a 1998 satirical comedy film written and directed by João Botelho. A co-production between Portugal, France and Denmark, it premiered into the main competition at the 55th Venice International Film Festival.

== Cast ==
- Joaquim Oliveira as Jesus
- Rita Blanco as Mother of Jesus
- Adriano Luz as Hélio
- Maria Emília Correia as Amélia Castro
- Henrique Canto e Castro as Hipólito
- Paulo Bragança as Lino
- Branca de Camargo as Redhead
- Nuno Melo as Gigolo
- João Perry as Bankier
- Alexandra Lencastre as Banker's Mistress
- Isabel de Castro as Casca
- Laura Soveral as Cassius
- Suzana Borges as Cicero

== Production ==
The film was shot between Lisbon, Cascais, Beja and Vila Real de Santo António. Botelho described it as a film in which he "depicted the state of the whole country as it is now - the trafficking of everything, of influence, of money, of women".

== Release ==
The film had its world premiere at the 55th edition of the Venice Film Festival, in which it entered the main competition; it was released in Portugal in December 1998.

== Reception ==
In Portugal, the film was a box office success, with about 40,000 admissions.

Mariuccia Ciotta from il manifesto praised the film, describing it as "caustic, sharp, colourful" and noting its Luis Buñuel, Manoel de Oliveira, and Pedro Almodóvar influences.
