= John Francis Lane =

British actor, journalist, and critic

- Born: 1 December 1928; Whitstable, Kent, England
- Died: 15 January 2018 (aged 89); Cosenza, Calabria, Italy
- Education: Royal Grammar School Worcester; Dulwich College
- Alma mater: Sorbonne, Paris; University of Florence
- Occupations: Actor, film writer, critic, journalist
- Employer(s): The Times; The Guardian; The Economist; Il Quotidiano (Cosenza)

What I enjoy most about living in Italy is that you never know quite when theatre ends and reality begins. I suppose it was also true in my private life.

— John Francis Lane

John Francis Lane (1 December 1928 – 15 January 2018) was an English journalist, critic and actor. He was known for being a small-part actor in many Italian films, and as a contributor to The Guardian writing obituaries for Italian cultural figures.

== Biography ==
Lane was born in Tankerton, a suburb of Whitstable in Kent, to a middle-class family in 1928. He became a boarder at the Royal Grammar School in Worcester, and towards the end of the Second World War attended Dulwich College in London. He then had a spell as a stage manager in London's West End.

Lane first visited Italy in 1949, following a German boyfriend from Paris, where he was then studying at the Sorbonne. After learning Italian at the University of Florence, he had settled in Rome by 1951, finding Italy more tolerant of his homosexuality than the Britain of the time. Learning Italian in Florence, he became entranced by the country after seeing Franco Zeffirelli's production of Troilus and Cressida. Zeffirelli later became one of his boyfriends.

He was made a Cavaliere in the 1975 Italian Order of Merit.

In retirement Lane lived in the town of Rende in the region of Calabria. He wrote frequently on Italian life for The Economist. His memoir, To Each His Own Dolce Vita, was published in 2013.

Lane died in January 2018 in Cosenza in southern Italy. Knowledge he had died was delayed and only emerged following the end of Zeffirelli's life.

== Filmography ==
| Year | Title | Role | Notes |
|---|---|---|---|
| 1960 | La Dolce Vita | Reporter | Uncredited |
| 1960 | Run with the Devil | Joe Freeman | As Francis Lane |
| 1960 | The Passionate Thief | | |
| 1960 | Chiamate 22-22 tenente Sheridan | avvocato Jordan | As Francis Lane |
| 1961 | The Wastrel | Invitato festa | |
| 1962 | The Witch's Curse | Coachman | As Francis Lane |
| 1962 | Il Sorpasso | Alfredo | |
| 1962 | The Two Colonels | | |
| 1963 | 8½ | Il giornalista | Uncredited |
| 1966 | El Greco | De Agueda | |
| 1967 | The Rover | Captain of the Port | |
| 1968 | A Quiet Place in the Country | Asylum Attendant | Uncredited |
| 1970 | Don Giovanni | Narrator | Voice As J. Francis Lane |
| 1972 | The Canterbury Tales | The Friar | |
| 1972 | Roma | Himself | |
| 1973 | Lucky Luciano | Journalist | As John F. Lane |
| 1974 | Moses the Lawgiver | Egyptian Consul | |
| 1979 | Dear Father | Direttore giornale | Uncredited |
| 1979 | Caligula | Maitre d' at Proculus' Wedding | Uncredited |
| 1983 | Another Time, Another Place | Farmer | |
| 1987 | Good Morning Babylon | | |
| 1990 | Saturday, Sunday and Monday | | |
| 1991 | Faccione | Samuel | |

== Bibliography ==
- To Each His Own Dolce Vita. Bear Claw Books. 2013. ISBN 9780957246249.
- Lane, John Francis (2024). Dawn Addams - My Life As Chaplin's Leading Lady. Santa Barbara: James Pepper Rare Books.
