= The Old Man of Belem =

- Directed by: Manoel de Oliveira
- Based on: O Penitente by Teixeira de Pascoaes
- Starring: Luís Miguel Cintra; Ricardo Trepa; Diogo Dória; Mário Barroso
- Production company: O Som e a Fúria
- Release dates: August 2014 (Venice); October 2014 (Portugal)
- Running time: 19 minutes
- Countries: Portugal; France
- Language: Portuguese

The Old Man of Belem (Portuguese: O Velho do Restelo) is a 2014 Portuguese-French short film directed by Manoel de Oliveira.

== Cast ==
- Luís Miguel Cintra as Camões
- Ricardo Trepa as Don Quixote
- Diogo Dória as Teixeira de Pascoaes
- Mário Barroso as Camilo Castelo Branco

== Reception ==
It was screened at the Out of Competition section of the 71st Venice International Film Festival.
