= Aquí (film) =

- International promotional poster
- Directed by: Tiago Guedes
- Screenplay by: Tiago Guedes; Luís Araújo
- Based on: the Jesús trilogy by J.M. Coetzee
- Produced by: Paulo Branco
- Starring: Manolo Solo; Patricia López Arnaiz; Daniel Elías; Lambert Wilson; Sergi López; Álex Peláez; Hugo Encuentra; Ángela Molina; Fernando Trueba
- Cinematography: Daniela Cajías
- Edited by: Jackie Bastide; Tiago Augusto
- Production company: Leopardo Filmes
- Distributed by: Alfama Films (France); Leopardo Filmes (Portugal)
- Release date: 18 May 2026 (Cannes)
- Running time: 200 minutes
- Countries: France; Portugal
- Language: Spanish

Aquí (English: Here) is a 2026 Spanish-language dystopian drama film directed by Tiago Guedes, co-written with Luís Araújo and based on the Jesús trilogy by J. M. Coetzee. It stars Álex Peláez, Manolo Solo, and Patricia López Arnaiz.

The film had its world premiere at the Cannes Premiere section of the 2026 Cannes Film Festival on 18 May.

== Plot ==
In a dystopian world, child refugee David acquaints with Simón, and then Inés, escaping together to a city, where the kid nurtures mysterious abilities.

== Cast ==
- Manolo Solo as Simón
- Patricia López Arnaiz as Inés
- Daniel Elías as Dimitri
- Lambert Wilson as Álvaro
- Sergi López as Daga
- Álex Peláez as David
- Hugo Encuentra as David (older)
- Itsaso Arana as Ana
- Camille Decourtye as Ana Magdalena
- Blaï Mateu Trias as Juan Arroyo
- Moreno Borja as Julio Fabricante
- Albano Jerónimo as Diego
- Rita Cabaço as social services employee
- Ángela Molina as Mercedes
- Fernando Trueba as Dr. Ribeiro

== Production ==
=== Development ===
A French-Portuguese co-production, it was produced by Paulo Branco through Leopardo Filmes, in co-production with Rádio e Televisão de Portugal (RTP), Alfama Films an APM. Alongside associated producers Belino Production, CB Partners and Filmgalerie 451. Supported by Instituto do Cinema e Audiovisual (ICA), PIC Portugal Fundo de Apoio ao Turismo e ao Cinema, Lisbon Municipal Chamber, Lisboa Film Commission, Porto City Hall, Filmaporto Film Commission, Viana do Castelo Municipal Chamber and Centre national du cinéma et de l'image animée.

=== Filming ===
Filming locations included the freguesia of Alvarães in Viana do Castelo, where Coetzee visited the shooting.

== Release ==
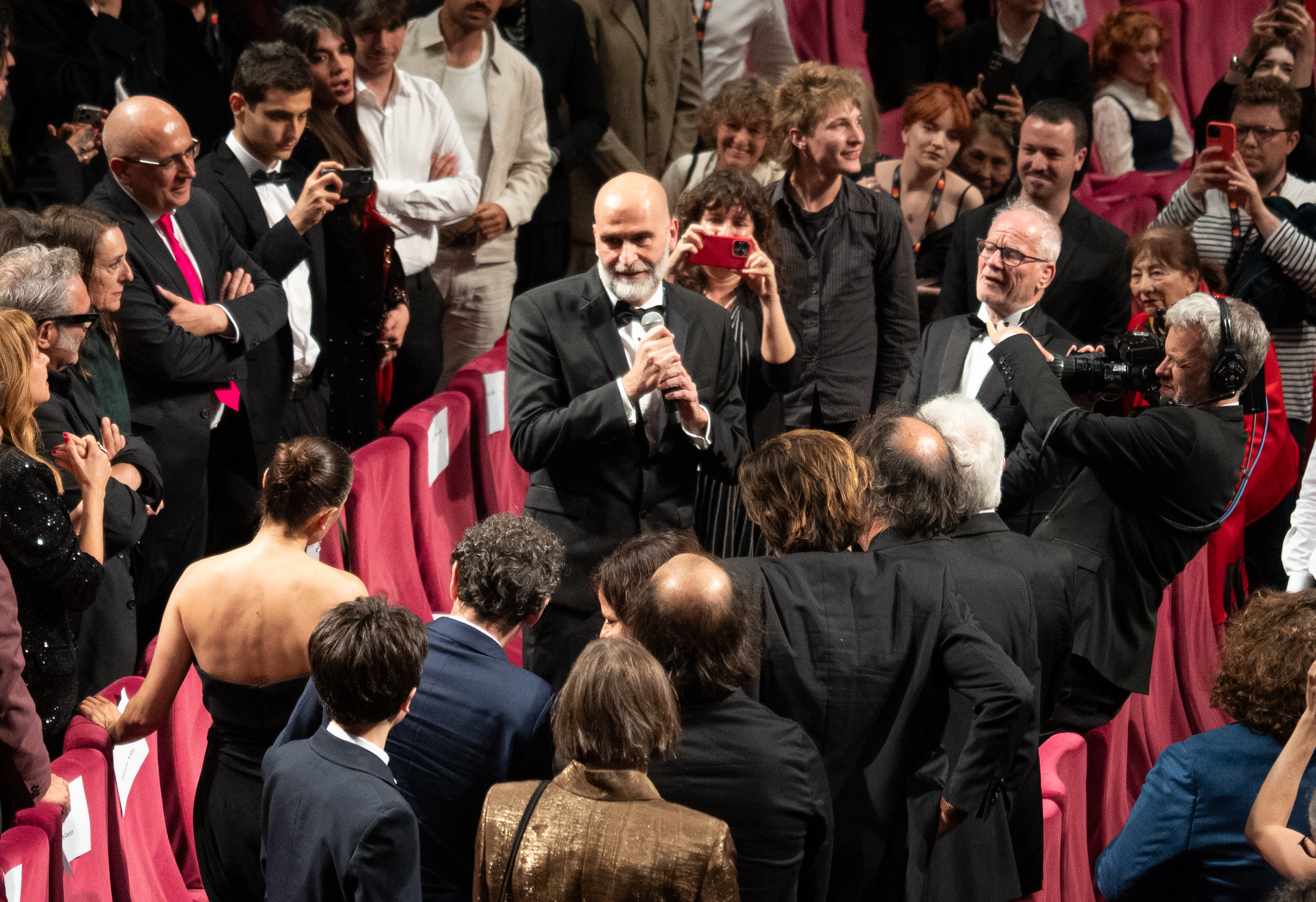
Tiago Guedes (center) cast and crew during the 2026 Cannes Film Festival

The film was screened at the 'Cannes Premiere' section of the 2026 Cannes Film Festival on 18 May. Films Boutique acquired sales rights to the film.
