= Fernando Pessoa University =

University located in Porto and Ponte de Lima, Portugal

Coordinates: 41°10′24.12″N 8°36′40.86″W

- Universidade Fernando Pessoa
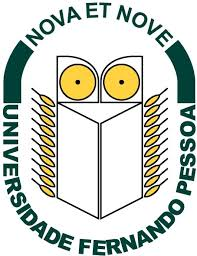
- Motto: Nova Et Nove
- Type: Private university
- Established: 1996
- Rector: Salvato Trigo
- Students: 5,000
- Location: Porto, Portugal
- Campus: Porto; Ponte de Lima
- Website: ufp.pt

Fernando Pessoa University (UFP; Portuguese: Universidade Fernando Pessoa) is a private university located in Porto and Ponte de Lima, Portugal. It was founded in 1996 and named after Fernando Pessoa, a Portuguese writer and poet.

== Courses ==
=== 1st Cycle Degrees ===
==== Porto ====
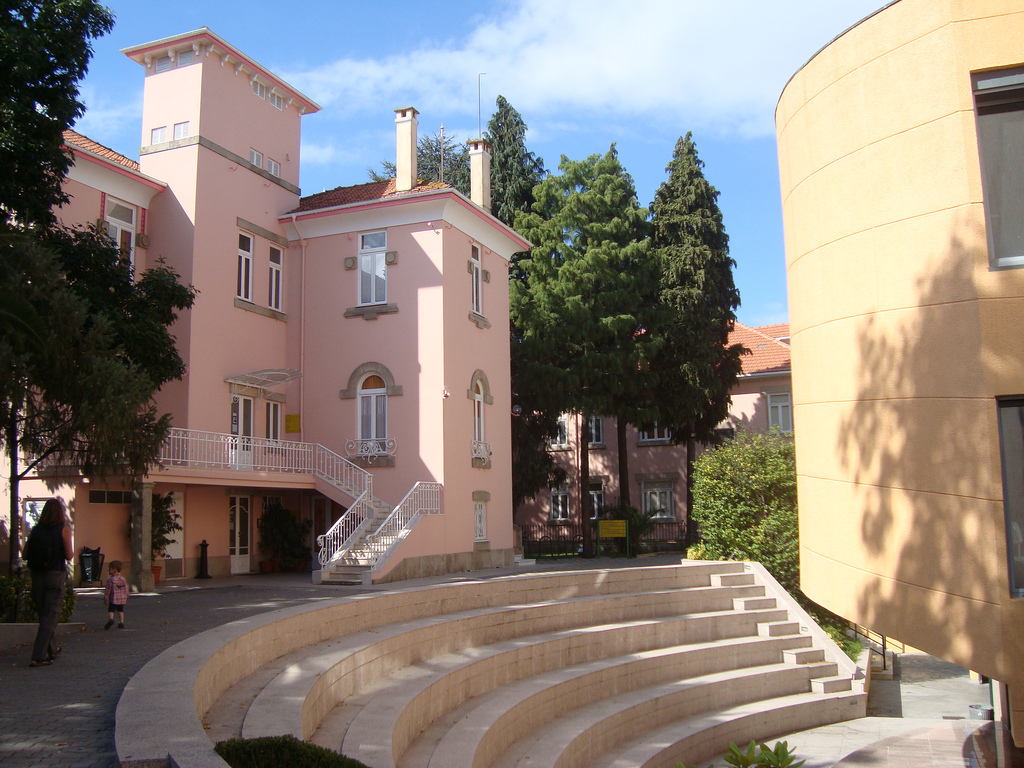
Fernando Pessoa University, Porto Campus

- Faculty of Science and Technology (FCT)
  - Civil Engineering
  - Quality, Hygiene and Safety Engineering
  - Environmental and Health Engineering
  - Computer Engineering
- Faculty of Health Sciences (FCS)
  - Clinical Analysis and Public Health
  - Nutrition Sciences
  - Nursing
  - Physiotherapy
  - Speech Therapy
- Faculty of Human and Social Sciences (FCHS)
  - Communication Sciences
  - Business Sciences
  - Political Science and International Relations
  - Cultural Studies
  - Criminology
  - Psychology
  - Information and Documentation Sciences
  - Social service

===== Integrated Master's Degrees =====
- Architecture and Urbanism
- Dentistry
- Pharmaceutical Sciences

==== Ponte de Lima ====
- Faculty of Health Sciences (FCS)
  - Nursing
  - Rehabilitation and Psychomotricity
- Faculty of Human and Social Sciences (FCHS)
  - Business Management and Accounting

=== 2nd Cycle Degrees ===
- Humanitarian Action, Cooperation and Development
- Specialized Laboratory Analyzes
- Communication Sciences
- Educational Sciences: Special Education
- Business Sciences
- Criminology
- Civil Engineering
- Computer Engineering
- Physiotherapy
- Clinical and Health Psychology
- Psychology of Justice: Victims of Violence and Crime

=== 3rd Cycle Degrees ===
- Information Sciences
- Earth Sciences
- Language Development and Disturbances
- Ecology and Environmental Health

== Investigation and development ==
The Fernando Pessoa University currently has 14 research centers, which makes it one of the most advanced private universities in Portugal in this field, being:

- Bioengineering and Pharmacological Center (CBFC)
- Center for Latin American Studies (CELA)
- Center for Communication Studies (CEC)
- Center for the Study of Minorities (CENMIN)
- Center for Applied Anthropology Studies (CEAA)
- Center for Trends in Hospitality and Tourism Studies (CETS-HT)
- Center for Studies and Multimedia Resources (CEREM)
- Center for Studies in Psychology (CEPSI)
- Center for Studies on Computer Text and Cyberliterature (CETIC)
- Center for Tax and Administration Studies (CETA)
- Center for Modeling and Analysis of Environmental Systems (CEMAS)
- Transdisciplinary Center for Consciousness Studies (CTEC)
- Laboratory of Studies and Projects (LEP)
- Facial Expression Laboratory of Emotion (FEELab)
- Biomedical Systems and Sensors Group (SiSeBi)

== See also ==
- List of universities in Portugal
- Higher education in Portugal
