= Tiago Guedes =

Portuguese filmmaker

- Guedes in 2026
- Born: 20 June 1971 (age 55); Porto, Portugal
- Education: Fernando Pessoa University
- Occupation: Filmmaker
- Years active: 1999–present

Tiago Guedes (born 20 June 1971) is a Portuguese filmmaker. Most known for his films The Domain (2019) and Aquí (2026), and the television series Glória (2021).

== Early life ==
After graduating at the Fernando Pessoa University, he studied cinema at the New York Film Academy (1997/98) and at Raindance Film School London (1999). He directed commercials and music videos for several years.

== Career ==
His first short film, O Ralo (1999), was co-directed with Frederico Serra. It won the Leopard of Tomorrow at the 52nd Locarno Film Festival. He made his film debut with the SIC-produced TV movie Alta Fidelidade (2000), co-directed with Frederico Serra.

His first feature film, Blood Curse (2006), premiered at the official opening of Fantasporto 2006. Co-directed by Frederico Serra and written by Rodrigo Guedes de Carvalho, Tiago's brother and a journalist and news anchor at SIC. It's considered Portugal first horror feature film.

In 2013 he co-created and directed all episodes of Odisseia, a comedy series broadcast by RTP1.

His drama film The Domain (2019) was selected to compete for the Golden Lion at the 76th Venice International Film Festival. Marking Guedes first entry in the festival, directly to the main competition. It was also selected as the Portuguese entry for the Best International Feature Film at the 92nd Academy Awards, but it was not nominated. A television miniseries version was later broadcast by RTP1.

In 2021, he directed all the episodes of Glória, a Portuguese historical thriller drama television series and the first Portuguese Netflix production. According to Variety, the show cost €6 million to produce, making it the most expensive series in Portuguese television history.

His drama film Remains of the Wind (2022) was selected to the Special Screenings section of the 2022 Cannes Film Festival, marking his first film selected to the festival.

Aquí (2026), based on the Jesús trilogy by J. M. Coetzee, premiered at the Cannes Premiere section of the 2026 Cannes Film Festival.

== Personal life ==
He was born in Porto and is married to actress Isabel Abreu.

== Filmography ==
=== Feature films ===
Year	English Title	Original Title	Notes
2006	Blood Curse	Coisa Ruim	co-directed with Frederico Serra
2008		Entre os Dedos	co-directed with Frederico Serra
2010	Bloody Night	Noite Sangrenta	co-directed with Frederico Serra
2019	Sadness and Joy in the Life of Giraffes	Tristeza e Alegria na Vida das Girafas	
2019	The Domain	A Herdade	
2022	Remains of the Wind	Restos do Vento	
2023	Dialogues After the End	Diálogos Depois do Fim	
2026	Aquí		

=== TV Movies ===
- Alta Fidelidade (2000) - co-directed with Frederico Serra
- Cavaleiros de Água Doce (2001)
- O Meu Sósia e Eu (2003)

=== Short films ===
- O Ralo (1999) - co-directed with Frederico Serra
- 11:00 A. M. (1999)
- Waking Up (2001) - co-directed with Frederico Serra
- Homenzinho (2007)
- Coro dos Amantes (2014)

=== Television ===
- Odisseia (2013)
- Os Boys (2016)
- Glória (2021)
