= Aqui na Terra =

Aqui na Terra (Here on Earth)
- Directed by: João Botelho
- Written by: João Botelho
- Starring: Luís Miguel Cintra; Jessica Weiss/Voz de Maria João Luís; Pedro Hestnes; Rita Dias
- Cinematography: Elso Roque
- Music by: António Pinho Vargas
- Distributed by: Marfilmes
- Release date: October 14, 1993
- Running time: 105 minutes
- Country: Portugal
- Language: Portuguese

Aqui na Terra (Here on Earth) is a 1993 Portuguese film directed and written by João Botelho. It stars Luís Miguel Cintra, Jessica Weiss/Voz de Maria João Luís, Pedro Hestnes, Rita Dias.

== Overview ==
- Direction: João Botelho
- Script: João Botelho
- Production: Companhia de filmes do Príncipe Real; BBC
- Format: 35mm, color
- Genre: fiction (drama)
- Duration: 105’
- Length: 2900 meters
- Distributor: Marfilmes
- Release Date: Cinema Nimas, in Lisbon, October 14, 1993

== Synopsis ==
Miguel is a successful economist until his father's death plunges him into a strange obscure world of fears, eerie sounds and psychological isolation. He quits his job, drifts away from his wife and initiates a process of physical disintegration. He will touch the bottom before he starts seeing the light. And, as an echo to his journey, we follow, faraway in the countryside, the story of a crime and its redemption, the story of António and Cecília. From death to the miracle of life, here on earth.

== Cast ==
- Luís Miguel Cintra as Miguel
- Jessica Weiss/Voz de Maria João Luís as Isabel
- Pedro Hestnes as António
- Rita Dias as Cecila

== Crew ==
- Director: João Botelho
- Cinematographer: Elso Roque
- Editing: José Nascimento
- Sound: Vasco Pimentel
- Production Design: Ana Vaz da Silva
- Score: António Pinho Vargas
- Costume Design: Manuela Aires, Rita Lopes Alves
- Makeup: Margarida Miranda

== See also ==
- Novo Cinema
