= A Portuguese Goodbye =

- Directed by: João Botelho
- Written by: João Botelho; Leonor Pinhão
- Produced by: João Botelho
- Starring: Isabel de Castro; Ruy Furtado; Maria Cabral; Fernando Heitor; Cristina Hauser; Henrique Viana; João Perry; António Peixoto
- Cinematography: Acácio de Almeida
- Edited by: João Botelho; Leandro Ferreira
- Release date: 17 April 1986
- Running time: 85 min.
- Country: Portugal
- Language: Portuguese

A Portuguese Goodbye (Portuguese: Um Adeus Português) is a 1986 Portuguese drama film directed and produced by João Botelho. The film stars Isabel de Castro, Ruy Furtado, Maria Cabral, Fernando Heitor and Cristina Hauser in the lead roles.

== Cast ==
- Isabel de Castro
- Ruy Furtado
- Maria Cabral
- Fernando Heitor
- Cristina Hauser
- Henrique Viana
- João Perry
- António Peixoto
