= Aniki-Bóbó =

1942 film

- Directed by: Manoel de Oliveira
- Produced by: António Lopes Ribeiro
- Release date: 18 December 1942
- Running time: 68 minutes
- Country: Portugal
- Language: Portuguese

Aniki-Bóbó is a 1942 Portuguese film directed by Manoel de Oliveira. It is his first feature-length film. The actors are mostly children from Oliveira's hometown, Porto. The script was adapted by Manoel de Oliveira from a short story by José Rodrigues de Freitas, Meninos Milionários (lit. Millionaire Children). 'Aniki-Bóbó' is a rhyme from a children's game, akin to Eeny, meeny, miny, moe.

== Reception ==
The film was not very well received, but with time it gained recognition and was finally accepted as one of the most important Portuguese films of its time. In several respects, this film seems to anticipate Italian neorealism. It would be 21 years before Oliveira directed his next feature film.

== Sources ==
- Johnson, Randal (2005). "Aniki-Bobó". In Mira, Alberto (ed.). The Cinema of Spain and Portugal. Wallflower Press. ISBN 978-1904764441 – via Google Books.
- Sadoul, Georges (1972). Dictionary of Films. University of California Press. ISBN 978-0520018648 – via Google Books.
