= Teresa Madruga =

Portuguese actress

- Born: 18 March 1953 (age 73); Horta, Açores, Portugal
- Occupation: Actress
- Years active: 1977–present

Teresa Madruga (born 18 March 1953) is a Portuguese actress. She has appeared in 71 films and television shows since 1977. She starred in the 1983 film In the White City, which was entered into the 33rd Berlin International Film Festival.

== Selected filmography ==
- Francisca (1981)
- In the White City (1983)
- Dead Man's Seat (1984)
- Manoel's Destinies (1985)
- Day of Despair (1992)
- Abraham's Valley (1993)
- Sostiene Pereira (1995)
- Get a Life (2001)
- Water and Salt (2001)
- Tabu (2012)
- Imagine (2012)
- Will-o'-the-Wisp (Fogo-Fátuo) (2022)
- A Few Things Happening by a River (2026)
