= Arabian Nights (2015 film) =

2015 film

- Film poster
- Directed by: Miguel Gomes
- Screenplay by: Telmo Churro; Miguel Gomes; Mariana Ricardo
- Based on: One Thousand and One Nights
- Produced by: Luís Urbano
- Starring: Crista Alfaiate; Dinarte Branco; Carloto Cotta; Adriano Luz; Rogério Samora; Maria Rueff; Cristina Carvalhal
- Cinematography: Sayombhu Mukdeeprom
- Edited by: Telmo Churro
- Music by: Mariana Ricardo
- Production companies: BOX Productions; Komplizen Film; O Som e a Fúria; Shellac Sud
- Distributed by: Shellac Distribution
- Release date: 16 May 2015 (Cannes)
- Running time: 383 minutes
- Countries: Portugal; France; Germany; Switzerland
- Language: Portuguese
- Budget: €2.7 million
- Box office: $50,171

Arabian Nights (Portuguese: As Mil e uma Noites) is a 2015 three-part drama film, co-written and directed by Miguel Gomes, based on the One Thousand and One Nights. It comprises Volume 1: The Restless One, Volume 2: The Desolate One and Volume 3: The Enchanted One; each volume is around two hours long.

It premiered on 16 May 2015 at the 68th Cannes Film Festival, as part of the Directors' Fortnight section. Volume 2: The Desolate One, was selected as the Portuguese entry for the Best Foreign Language Film at the 88th Academy Awards, but it was not nominated.

== Plot ==
The film is set in Portugal, with the plot drawing from current events. The film's structure is based on the One Thousand and One Nights collection of fantasy tales.

== Cast ==
- Crista Alfaiate as Shahrazād
- Dinarte Branco as Uomo del Patronato
- Carloto Cotta as Traduttore
- Adriano Luz as Luis
- Joana de Verona as Vania
- Rogério Samora as Primo Ministro
- Maria Rueff as Ministro delle Finanze
- Cristina Carvalhal as Sereia
- Luísa Cruz as Juiza
- Américo Silva as Negoziante di Gado
- Bruno Bravo as Uomo della Banca Centrale Europea
- Tiago Fagulha as Uomo della Commissione Europea
- Teresa Madruga as Luisa
- Chico Chapas as Xico Chapas
- Carla Maciel as Nora
- Margarida Carpinteiro as Gloria

== Production ==
Filming was expected to end in August 2014 and completed in February 2015.

The Restless One was released at 125 minutes, The Desolate One had a runtime of 132 minutes and The Enchanted One also clocks in at 125 minutes.

== Release ==
The three installments of Arabian Nights premiered at the 2015 Cannes Film Festival. Volume 1: The Restless One on 16 May 2015, Volume 2: The Desolate One on 18 May 2015, and Volume 3: The Enchanted One on 20 May 2015. The films were released in France on 24 June, 29 July, and 26 August.

Film	Release date (Portugal)	Box office gross			Budget	Reference
Film	Release date (Portugal)	North America	Other territories	Worldwide	Budget	Reference
The Restless One	27 August 2015	$12,260	$15,985	$28,245	—N/a	
The Desolate One	24 September 2015	$6,398	$8,847	$15,245	—N/a	
The Enchanted One	8 October 2015	$4,502	$2,179	$6,681	—N/a	
Total		$23,160	$27,011	$50,171	€2.7 million	

=== Critical reception ===
The series as a whole was received positively by critics. Rotten Tomatoes reports that Volume 1 has a 97% score based on 35 reviews, with an average rating of 8/10. The website's critics consensus reads: "Miguel Gomes' vibrant twist on Arabian Nights spins myriad yarns that coalesce into a colorful ode to Portugal." Volume 2 has a 100% score based on 17 reviews, with an average rating of 8.1/10. Volume 3 has a 88% score based on 25 reviews, with an average rating of 7.1/10. On Metacritic, Volume 1 has an 80 out of 100 rating based on 10 critics, indicating "generally favorable reviews". Volume 2 has an 81 out of 100 rating based on 9 critics, indicating "universal acclaim". Volume 3 has an 80 out of 100 rating based on 10 critics, indicating "generally favorable reviews".

== See also ==
- List of submissions to the 88th Academy Awards for Best Foreign Language Film
- List of Portuguese submissions for the Academy Award for Best Foreign Language Film
