= Francisca (film) =

1981 Portuguese film

- Directed by: Manoel de Oliveira
- Written by: Manoel de Oliveira; Agustina Bessa-Luís (novel)
- Produced by: Paulo Branco
- Starring: Teresa Menezes; Diogo Dória; Mário Barroso
- Cinematography: Elso Roque
- Edited by: Monique Rutler
- Release date: 3 December 1981
- Running time: 166 minutes
- Country: Portugal
- Language: Portuguese

Francisca is a 1981 Portuguese drama film based on the novel Fanny Owen by Agustina Bessa-Luís and directed by Manoel de Oliveira. The film was selected as the Portuguese entry for the Best Foreign Language Film at the 55th Academy Awards, but was not accepted as a nominee.

== Plot ==
The story is of a young man, the son of an English officer, who ends in fatalism and disgrace due to an ill-fated passion.

== Cast ==
- Teresa Menezes as Francisca 'Fanny' Owen
- Diogo Dória as José Augusto
- Mário Barroso as Camilo

== See also ==
- List of submissions to the 55th Academy Awards for Best Foreign Language Film
- List of Portuguese submissions for the Academy Award for Best Foreign Language Film
