= Rita Azevedo Gomes =

Portuguese film director (born 1952)

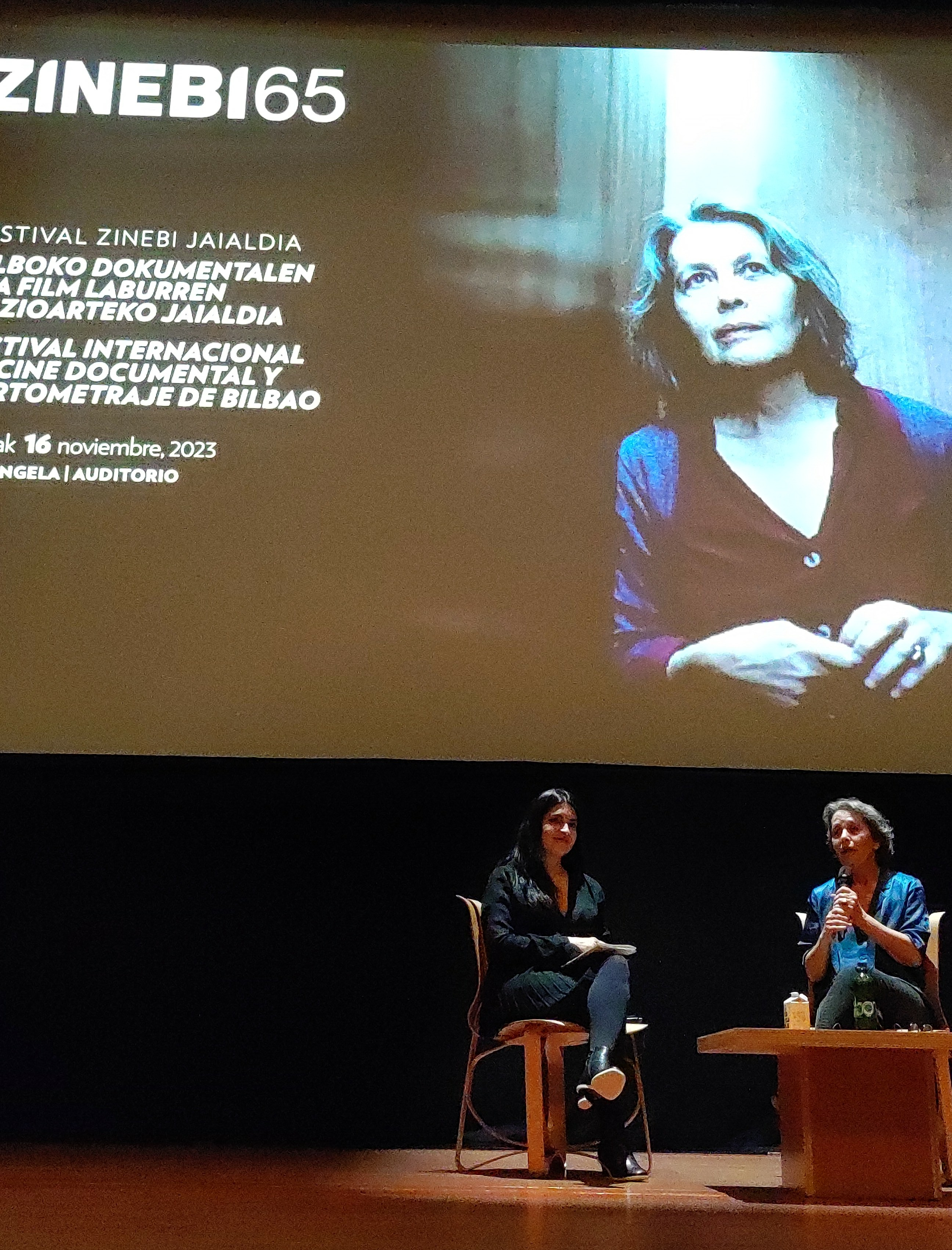
Rita Azevedo Gomes in the ZINEBI interview in Bilbao

Rita Azevedo Gomes (born in 1952) is a Portuguese filmmaker. Her work, Characterized by its experimental style, have been recognized at many film festivals such as the Berlin International Film Festival, DocLisboa, and the Las Palmas de Gran Canaria International Film Festival.

== Career ==
Rita Azevedo Gomes was born in Lisbon in 1952. She studied at the Lisbon School of Fine Arts, after which she spent a year teaching visual education in São Bartolomeu de Messines. Upon returning to Lisbon, she became involved in the arts, working across multiple fields from visual to graphic arts as well as opera, theatre, and cinema. In the field of graphic arts, she produced notable film related work for the Calouste Gulbenkian Foundation and the Portuguese Cinematheque.

She served as artistic director, set designer, and costume designer for theatre productions such as Antigone and The Seagull. In cinema, she worked as a costume designer, assistant director, and still photographer for directors such as Werner Schroeter, Manoel de Oliveira, and Valeria Sarmiento.

In 1990, Azevedo Gomes made her directorial debut with O Som da Terra a Tremer. She went on to direct several features including Fragile as the World (2001), A Woman's Revenge (2012), Correspondências (2016), The Portuguese Woman and F***k the Polis (2025). Her films have been screened internationally and are recognized for their experimental structures, and theatrical compositions. Much of her work is based on literature, adapting authors like Robert Musil, Agustina Bessa-Luís, and Maria Gabriela Llansol.

== Filmography ==
- O Som da Terra a Tremer (1990)
- O cinema vai ao teatro (1996)
- King Arthur (1996)
- Intromissoes (1998)
- 25 de abril (1999)
- Fragile as the World (2001)
- A 15ª pedra - Manoel de Oliveira e João Bénard da Costa em conversa filmada (2007)
- A coleççao invisivel (2008)
- A Woman's Revenge (2012)
- Correspondências (2016)
- The Portuguese Woman (A Portuguesa) (2018)
- O trio en mi bemol (2022)
- F***k the Polis (2025)

== Style and themes ==
Rita Azevedo Gomes’s films are boldly experimental, drawing heavily on other art forms such as painting, literature, poetry, and theater. Sound design plays a central role in her work, shaped through collaborations with musical figures like José Mário Branco. She frequently uses narrators and voiceover as an homage to Portugal’s tradition of oral storytelling. The style of her filmmaking is deeply informed by her years as a film programmer at the Cinemateca Portuguesa, and her oeuvre reflects the influence of filmmakers such as Ingmar Bergman, F. W. Murnau, and Manoel de Oliveira.

In her films, sound and voice are often constructed as parallel narrative layers, adding a dreamlike atmosphere that reshape the viewer’s experience of her work. Many of her films revolve around characters consumed by emotional obsessions, such as the widower in Altar and the duchess in A Woman’s Revenge. Azevedo Gomes uses these narratives to explore how stories can deeply resonate with and transform their audiences.

== Awards and nominations ==
Best director at the Angra do Heroísmo international film festival for Altar. A Portuguesa won the Golden Lady Harimaguada at Las Palmas de Gran Canaria International Film Festival, 2019.

| Year | Festival | Award | Film | Result | Notes |
|---|---|---|---|---|---|
| 1990 | Torino International Festival of Young Cinema | Best Film | O Som Da Terra, Um Tremer | Nominated | |
| 2002 | Angra do Heroísmo International Film Festival | Best Director | Altar | Won | |
| 2012 | XIX Cinesul-Ibero-American Film and Video Festival | Best Feature Film | A Woman's Revenge | Won | |
| 2012 | Caminhos do Cinema Português Festival | Best Cinematography, Best Art Direction and Best Costume Design | A Woman's Revenge | Won | |
| 2016 | DocLisboa | José Saramago Prize | Correspondências | Won | |
| 2016 | Caminhos do Cinema Português | Best Director | Correspondências | Won | |
| 2016 | Locarno International Film Festival | Golden Lion | Correspondências | Nominated | |
| 2018 | Mar del Plata International Film Festival | International Competition Category | A Portuguesa | Selected | |
| 2019 | XIX Las Palmas de Gran Canaria International Film Festival | "Lady Harimaguada" Gold Award for Best Film | A Portuguesa | Won | |
| 2019 | Sophia Awards | Best Feature-Length Documentary | Correspondências | Nominated | |
| 2019 | Berlin International Film Festival | Official Selection | A Portuguesa | Won | |
| 2022 | NOVA Faculty of Social Sciences and Humanities, at Indie Lisboa | Best Direction Award for a Portuguese Feature Film | O Trio em Mi Bemol | Won | |
