= A Corte do Norte =

- Film poster
- Directed by: João Botelho
- Starring: Ana Moreira
- Release date: 19 March 2009
- Country: Portugal
- Language: Portuguese

A Corte do Norte (lit. 'The northern court') is a 2009 Portuguese film directed by João Botelho.

== Cast ==
- Ana Moreira

== Reception ==
It was nominated for the 2010 Portuguese Golden Globe for Best Film.
