= Amor de Perdição (1978 film) =

1978 film

- Directed by: Manoel de Oliveira
- Based on: Amor de Perdição by Camilo Castelo Branco
- Produced by: Paulo Branco
- Starring: António Sequeira Lopes; Cristina Hauser; Elsa Wellenkamp
- Release date: 12 November 1978 (Lisbon)
- Country: Portugal
- Language: Portuguese

Amor de Perdição (Lit. Love of Perdition) is a 1978 Portuguese film directed by Manoel de Oliveira. Amor de Perdição is conceived as a succession of "live images" shot with a camera, in still shots, mostly in studio décor, with few outside views. The image composition is quite careful, in keeping with such deliberate artificialism, sometimes with expressionistic traits.

== Cast ==
- António Sequeira Lopes
- Cristina Hauser
- Elsa Wellenkamp
