= Belle Toujours =

- Directed by: Manoel de Oliveira
- Written by: Manoel de Oliveira
- Produced by: Miguel Cadilhe; Serge Lalou
- Starring: Michel Piccoli; Bulle Ogier; Ricardo Trêpa
- Cinematography: Sabine Lancelin
- Edited by: Valérie Loiseleux
- Release dates: 8 September 2006 (Venice); 11 April 2007 (France)
- Running time: 68 minutes
- Country: Portugal
- Language: French

Belle Toujours is a 2006 French-language Portuguese film directed by Manoel de Oliveira. It was Portugal's submission to the 80th Academy Awards for the Academy Award for Best Foreign Language Film, but was not accepted as a nominee. It is a sequel to the film Belle de Jour (1967).

== Plot ==
Severine and Henri are reunited decades after their earlier encounter in Luis Buñuel's 1967 film, Belle de Jour. Severine is reluctant to see Henri again, yet he is adamant about seeing her again. She resents that by seeing her former blackmailer she has to confront her past of adultery and prostitution. Nevertheless, she is curious to know whether Henri revealed her secret life to her paralysed doctor husband as he was dying.

== Reception ==
The film was generally well received. It holds a 71% "fresh" rating on Rotten Tomatoes based on 42 reviews, with an average score of 6.29/10. The site's consensus reads: "An unexpectedly moving sequel to Luis Bunuel's Belle du Jour, Belle Toujours is a short and sweet elegy on aging, sexuality, and the power of cinema".

Philip French writing in The Observer described the film as "caviar to the general, but an elegant treat for cinephiles." Time Out said that the film offers "a deceptive, philosophical and cautionary meditation, not only on age, appetite, pleasure, betrayal, mendacity, revenge and disillusionment but also in idle curiosity."

=== Nominations ===
European Film Awards

- European Film Award for Best Actor – Michel Piccoli

Golden Globes (Portugal)

- Best Film – Manoel de Oliveira

LUX Prize 2007

- Best Film

The film was also in the Official Selection of the 63rd Venice International Film Festival, screened in the "Out of Competition" section.

== See also ==
- Cinema of Portugal
- List of submissions to the 80th Academy Awards for Best Foreign Language Film
