= Benilde or the Virgin Mother =

1975 film

- Directed by: Manoel de Oliveira
- Written by: Manoel de Oliveira; José Régio (play)
- Produced by: Paulo Branco
- Starring: Maria Amélia Matta; Jorge Rolla; Varela Silva
- Cinematography: Elso Roque
- Edited by: Manoel de Oliveira
- Release date: 21 November 1975
- Running time: 112 minutes
- Country: Portugal
- Language: Portuguese

Benilde or the Virgin Mother (Benilde ou a Virgem Mãe) is a 1975 Portuguese drama film based on the play by José Régio and directed by Manoel de Oliveira.

== Plot ==
Raised in seclusion, a young woman claims her unborn child was conceived through an angel.

== Cast ==
- Maria Amélia Matta as Benilde
- Jorge Rolla as Eduardo, Benilde's cousin
- Varela Silva as Melo Cantos, Benilde's father
- Glória de Matos as Etelvina, Eduardo's mother
- Maria Barroso as Genoveva, the house-keeper
- Augusto De Figueiredo as Cristóvão, the priest
- Jacinto Ramos as Fabrício, the doctor
