= Robert Kobena Dentu =

- Born: Shama, Western Region, Ghana
- Spouse: Gladys Dentu
- Children: 7
- Religion: Christianity
- Church: The Church of Pentecost
- Congregations served: The Church of Pentecost
- Offices held: Area Head
- Title: Prophet, The Church of Pentecost

Robert Kobena Dentu is a Ghanaian Church of Pentecost minister, and a former director of the Ghana Evangelism Committee (2011- 2015). He participated in creating the Ghana Evangelism Committee through which the National Congress on Evangelism (NACO) emerged in 2012.

The National Congress on Evangelism (NACO 2012) was a product of a collaborative partnership with other churches in Ghana.

Dentu holds the position of Area Head for the Church of Pentecost in Nkawkaw, where he remains active as an evangelist.
