= The Domain (film) =

2019 Portuguese drama film

- Film Poster
- Directed by: Tiago Guedes
- Written by: Rui Cardoso Martins; Tiago Guedes; Gilles Taurand
- Produced by: Paulo Branco
- Starring: Albano Jerónimo; Sandra Faleiro; Miguel Borges; João Vicente; João Pedro Mamede; Ana Vilela da Costa; Rodrigo Tomás; Beatriz Brás
- Cinematography: João Lança Morais
- Edited by: Roberto Perpignani
- Distributed by: Leopardo Filmes
- Release dates: 5 September 2019 (Venice); 19 September 2019 (Portugal)
- Running time: 166 minutes
- Countries: Portugal; France
- Language: Portuguese
- Box office: $279,565

The Domain (Portuguese: A Herdade) is a 2019 Portuguese drama film directed by Tiago Guedes. It was selected to compete for the Golden Lion at the 76th Venice International Film Festival. It was also selected as the Portuguese entry for the Best International Feature Film at the 92nd Academy Awards, but it was not nominated. A television series version of the film was also released by RTP1.

== Plot ==
The Fernandes are a family of landowners who have passed down a vast estate on the southern bank of the Tagus River in Portugal for generations. In 1973 João, the undisputed patriarch and current owner of the estate, will have to deal with the events linked to the Carnation Revolution of 1974 and, twenty years later, with the anxieties and the legacy of the next generation.

== Cast ==
- Albano Jerónimo as João Fernandes
- Sandra Faleiro as Leonor
- Miguel Borges as Joaquim Correia
- João Vicente as Leonel Sousa
- João Pedro Mamede as Miguel
- Ana Vilela da Costa as Rosa
- Rodrigo Tomás as António
- Beatriz Brás as Teresa

== Release ==
On September 5, 2019, the film was shown as part of the Official Selection at the Venice International Film Festival where it received a standing ovation after its first showing. The film was then released in Portugal on September 19, 2019.

== Awards ==
The homestead won the Golden Globe for Best Film at the 25th Golden Globes Gala, taking place at the Coliseu dos Recreios, in a ceremony presented by Jorge Corrula and Soraia Chaves.

== See also ==
- List of submissions to the 92nd Academy Awards for Best International Feature Film
- List of Portuguese submissions for the Academy Award for Best International Feature Film
