= João Botelho =

Portuguese film director

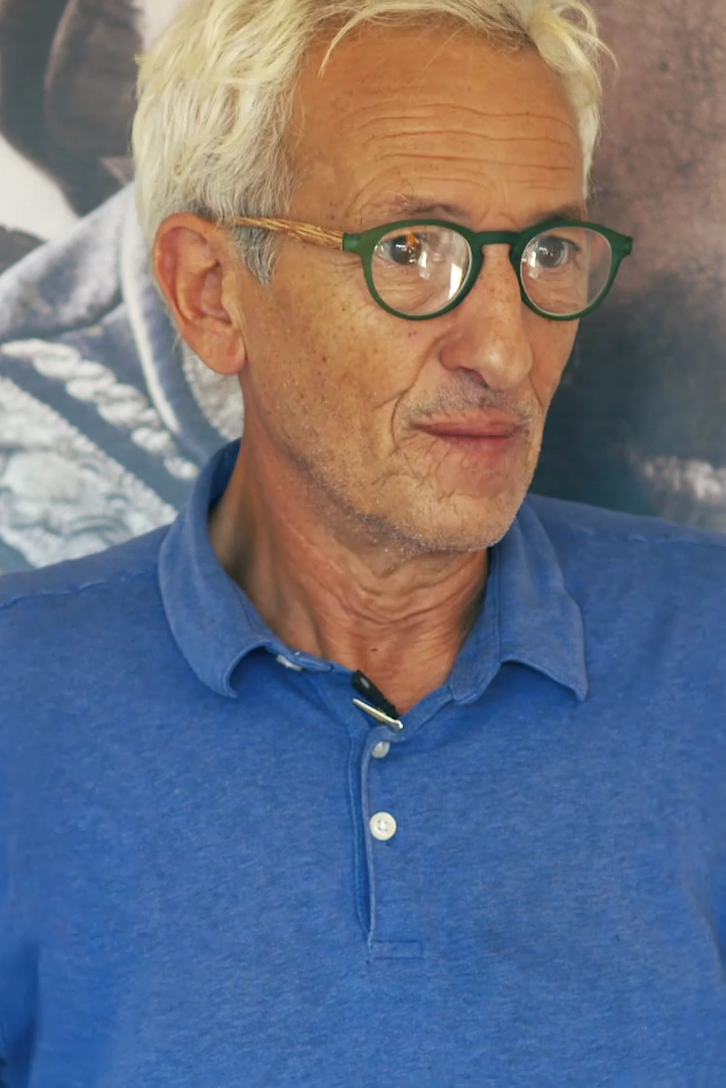
- João Botelho
- Born: João Manuel Relvas Leopoldo Botelho; 11 May 1949 (age 77); Lamego, Portugal
- Education: University of Coimbra; Lisbon Theatre and Film School
- Occupations: Film director, screenwriter
- Spouse: Leonor Pinhão
- Children: Francisco Pinhão Botelho, António Pinhão Botelho, and Joana Pinhão Botelho

João Manuel Relvas Leopoldo Botelho (born 1949) is a Portuguese film director.

He has directed and written the screenplays of numerous films. His films have won several awards. His works have been nominated for the Venice Film Festival's Golden Lion.

Botelho was awarded the prestigious Ordem do Infante D.Henrique (Grau Comendador), one of the highest Portuguese honors, by President Jorge Sampaio on 10 June 2005.

== Early years ==
Botelho was born in Lamego, northern Portugal. He enrolled in mechanical engineering at the University of Coimbra and in cinema at the Lisbon Theatre and Film School (Escola Superior de Teatro e Cinema), in 1974, dropping out in both cases. He has worked as a graphic artist. His first cinematographic works were O Alto do Cobre and Um Projecto de Educação Popular, both in 1976.

== Awards ==
- In 1985, he won the Tucano de Ouro for Best Director at the Rio de Janeiro Film Festival for Um Adeus Português.
- Nominated for the Golden Globes, Portugal in 1999 for Best Director and Best Film for Tráfico
- OCIC Promotional Award, Forum of New Cinema for: Um Adeus Português in the Berlin International Film Festival, 1986.
- Audience Award for A Corte do Norte, Coimbra Caminhos do Cinema Português Festival 2009.
- Special Mention for A Corte do Norte in the Rome Film Fest, in 2008.

Several nominations and awards in the Venice Film Festival:

- Nominated to Golden Lion for O Fatalista in 2005, Quem És Tu? in 2001 and Tráfico in 1998.
- Won the Mimmo Rotella Foundation Award for Quem És Tu? in 2001 and had a FIPRESCI Prize – Honorable Mention in 1988 for Tempos Difíceis.

== Special participations in festivals ==
- Member of the jury of the 29th São Paulo International Film Festival, held in São Paulo, Brazil, from 21 October to 3 November 2005.
- Member of the jury of the 27th Three Continents Festival, held 22–29 November 2005 in Nantes, France.
- Honored with a tribute by the Festival Cinéma du Réel in Paris (France) in March 2006.
- Honored with a tribute by the Festival Internacional du Film de La Rochelle (France) in June and July 1999.

== Filmography ==
The following films were directed by Botelho. For all except Um Projecto De Educação Popular, O Alto Do Cobre, No Dia Dos Meus Anos, 13 Filmes X 3, As Mãos E As Pedras, and Viagem Ao Coração Do Douro, A Terra Onde Nasci, he also wrote the screenplay.

- O Alto do Cobre (1976, Short)
- Um Projecto de Educação Popular (1976, Short)
- Os Bonecos de Santo Aleixo (1977, Feature documentary)
- Alexandre Rosa (1978) | Short with Jorge Alves da Silva – Premiere in Semaine des Cahiers – Paris, cinema Action République
- Conversa Acabada (1980, The Other One) | Premiere in Cannes Film Festival, Directors' Fortnight
- A Portuguese Goodbye (1985, A Portuguese Farewell) | Premiere in Festival of London, Rio de Janeiro – Tucano de Ouro, New Film, New Directors, MOMA New York, Forum of Berlin
- Tempos Difíceis (1988, Hard Times) | Premiere in Venice Film Festival, official selection, competition – award of Italian critics-, Festival of New York, Lincoln Center
- No Dia dos Meus Anos (1991, On My Birthday) | On demand of RTP/ARTE sur les 4 éléments; premiere in Festival of Locarno, official selection, competition
- Aqui na Terra (1993, Here on Earth) | Venice Film Festival official selection, competition; film selected to the day of Europe, exhibition simultaneously in Germany, France and Portugal.
- Três Palmeiras (1994, Three Palm Trees) | On demand of Lisbon 94, European Capital of Culture; premiere in Cannes Film Festival, Quinzaine des Réalisateurs
- 13 Filmes X 3’ (1996) | for Trio de Quattro, RTP
- Tráfico (1998, Traffic) | Premiere in Venice Film Festival, official selection, competition
- Se a Memória Existe (1999, Digital Video, 30’) | – commande pour le 25eme anniversaire du 25 Avril; première au Festival de Venise, nouveaux territoires
- Quem És Tu? (2001) | Venice Film Festival, official selection, competition; Mimo Rotella Award for Best Artistic Contribution in Venice Biennale
- As Mãos e as Pedras (2001, Digital Video, 12’) | Opening Film of Porto 2001, European Capital of Culture
- A Mulher que Acreditava ser Presidente dos Estados Unidos da América (2003, The Woman Who Believed She Was President of the United States) | Premiere in Cannes Film Festival, Quinzaine dés Réalisateurs, opening film
- A Luz na Ria Formosa (2005, Documentário, Digital Video, 50’) | Festival DocLisboa and selected officially in Turin Film Festival, Cinema de Reel, Paris, Vienna, Áustria and Festival di Popolo, Florence
- O Fatalista (2005, The Fatalist) | Premiere in Venice Film Festival, official selection, competition; Toronto International Film Festival, Sevilha, Mostra de São Paulo, etc.
- A Baleia Branca, Uma Ideia de Deus (2006, Documentary, 50’, Digital Video) | On RTP demand to the worldwide theatre play day to the show Moby Dick, in Municipal Theatre of São Luiz
- A Terra Antes do Céu (2007, Documentary, 50’, Digital Video) | On demand of Direcção Geral de Cultura do Norte to the commemorations of the birth's century of Miguel Torga, a great poet and storyteller of the Portuguese twentieth century
- Corrupção (2007, Corruption) | This film was not signed by João Botelho, which was motivated by a dispute with the producer
- A Corte do Norte (2009, The Northern Land) | Premiere in New York Film Festival, Special Mention in Festival Internazionale del Film Di Roma, Italy
- Filme do Desassossego (2010), based on The Book of Disquiet, by Bernado Soares, a semi-heteronym by Fernando Pessoa
- Os Maias (2014), based on the novel Os Maias by Eça de Queirós
- Peregrinação (2017), based on the novel Peregrinação by Fernão Mendes Pinto
- O Ano da Morte de Ricardo Reis (2020), based on the novel O Ano da Morte de Ricardo Reis by José Saramago
- O Jovem Cunhal (2022)
- Um Filme em Forma de Assim (2022)
