= Rita Durão =

Portuguese actress

Rita Durão (born 21 January 1976 in Lisbon) is a Portuguese actress. She has appeared in more than thirty films since 1996.

== Selected filmography ==
Film
Year	Title	Role	Notes
2012	A Vingança de uma Mulher		
2007	From Now On		
2003	Sansa		
2003	Come and Go		
2000	April Captains		
1999	As Bodas de Deus		

== Awards ==
- Shooting Stars Award (2000)
