= Agustina Bessa-Luís =

Portuguese writer (1922–2019)

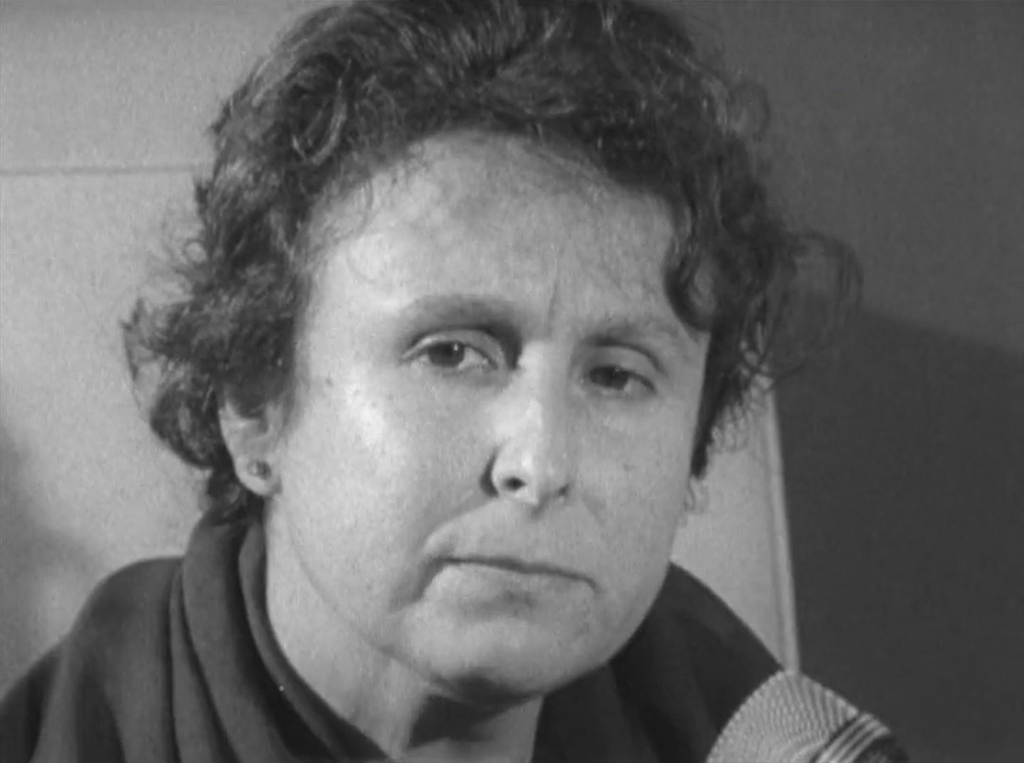
Agustina Bessa-Luís in 1969

Agustina Bessa-Luís, GOSE (Portuguese: [ɐɣuʃˈtinɐ ˈβɛsɐ luˈiʃ]; 15 October 1922 – 3 June 2019) was a Portuguese writer. From 1986 and 1987, she was director of the daily O Primeiro de Janeiro (Porto). From 1990 to 1993, she was director of the D. Maria II National Theatre (Lisbon). Her novels have been adapted for the screen by director Manoel de Oliveira: Fanny Owen ("Francisca"), Abraham's Valley, and The Lands of Risk ("The Convent"), in addition to the Party. Director João Botelho directed A Corte do Norte based on Agustina's homonymous novel.

== Awards ==
She was awarded the Camões Prize in 2004.

== Works ==
- A Sibila (1954; "The Sibyl")
- ESTADOS ERÓTICOS IMEDIATOS DE SÖREN KIERKEGAARD [SØREN KIERKEGAARD'S IMMEDIATE EROTIC STAGES], Is based on Kierkegaard text from The Seducer's Diary, The immediate erotic stages or the musical-erotic, – popular name: The Don Juan-analysis -, and The Journals, 1992
- Os Incuráveis (1956)
- A Muralha (1957)
- O Susto (1958)
- Ternos Guerreiros (1960)
- O Manto (1961)
- O Sermão do Fogo (1962)
- As Relações Humanas: I – Os Quatro Rios (1964)
- As Relações Humanas: II – A Dança das Espadas (1965)
- As Relações Humanas: III – Canção Diante de uma Porta Fechada (1966)
- A Bíblia dos Pobres: I – Homens e Mulheres (1967)
- A Bíblia dos Pobres: II – As Categorias (1970)
- As Pessoas Felizes (1975)
- Crónica do Cruzado Osb (1976)
- As Fúrias (1977)
- Fanny Owen (1979)
- O Mosteiro (1980)
- Os Meninos de Ouro (1983)
- Adivinhas de Pedro e Inês
- Um Bicho da Terra (1984), a biography of Uriel da Costa
- Um Presépio Aberto (1984)
- A Monja de Lisboa (1985) a biography of Maria de Visitação
- A Corte do Norte (1987)
- Prazer e Glória (1988)
- A Torre (1988)
- Eugénia e Silvina (1989)
- Vale Abraão (1991)
- Ordens Menores (1992)
- Fake-book (1992) Aphorisms with etchings by Daniel Garbade
- As Terras do Risco (1994)
- O Concerto dos Flamengos (1994)
- Aquário e Sagitário (1995) short story
- Um Outro Olhar sobre Portugal (1995), Voyage with photographs by Pierre Rossollin and Illustrations by Maluda
- Memórias Laurentinas (1996)
- Um Cão que Sonha (1997)
- O Comum dos Mortais (1988)
- A Quinta Essência (1999)
- Dominga (1999)
- Contemplação Carinhosa da Angústia (2000), Anthologie
- O Princípio da Incerteza: I – Jóia de Família (2001)
- O Princípio da Incerteza: II – A Alma dos Ricos (2002)
- O Princípio da Incerteza: III – Os Espaços em Branco (2003)
- Antes do Degelo (2004)
- Doidos e Amantes (2005)
- A Ronda da Noite (2006)

== Sources ==
- Jens Staubrand: Kierkegaard International Bibliography Music Works and Plays, Copenhagen 2009. In English and Danish. ISBN 978-87-92510-05-1
