= Mário Barroso =

Portuguese actor and director (born 1947)

- Born: Mário Barroso; 15 August 1947 (age 78); Lisbon, Portugal
- Occupations: film director, actor, cinematographer
- Years active: 1980 - presents

Mário Barroso (born 15 August 1947) is a Portuguese film director, actor and cinematographer born in Lisbon.
