= List of Portuguese films of the 1990s =

A list of films produced in the Cinema of Portugal ordered by year of release in the 1990s. For an alphabetical list of Portuguese films see Category:Portuguese films

== 1990s ==
Title	Director	Cast	Genre	Notes
1990
A Maldição do Marialva	António de Macedo			
Filha da Mãe (Lovely Child)	João Canijo			
Non, ou a Vã Glória de Mandar	Manoel de Oliveira			Screened at the 1990 Cannes Film Festival
O Processo do Rei (The King's Trial)	João Mário Grilo			
1991
A Divina Comédia (The Divine Comedy)	Manoel de Oliveira			
Um Crime de Luxo (A Luxury Crime)	Artur Semedo			
Os Cornos de Cronos	José Fonseca e Costa			
A Idade Maior	Teresa Villaverde			
1992
O Último Mergulho	João César Monteiro			
The End of the World	João Mário Grilo			Screened at the 1993 Cannes Film Festival
Retrato de Família	Luís Galvão Teles			
Rosa Negra	Margarida Gil			
Udju Azul di Yonta (The Blue Eyes of Yonta)	Flora Gomes			Co-production with Guinea-Bissau and France
Xavier	Manuel Mozos			
1993
Amor e Dedinhos de Pé	Luís Filipe Rocha			Co-production with France and Spain
Coitado do Jorge (Poor Jorge)	Jorge Silva Melo			
Vale Abraão (Abraham's Valley)	Manoel de Oliveira			
1994
Lisbon Story	Wim Wenders			Screened at the 1995 Cannes Film Festival
Passagem por Lisboa	Eduardo Geada			
A Caixa (The Box)	Manoel de Oliveira			
Casa de Lava (Down to Earth)	Pedro Costa			Screened at the 1994 Cannes Film Festival
Três Irmãos	Teresa Villaverde			
1995
Adão e Eva	Joaquim Leitão			
A Comédia de Deus (God's Comedy)	João César Monteiro			
Corte de Cabelo	Joaquim Sapinho			
O Convento (The Convent)	Manoel de Oliveira			Entered into the 1995 Cannes Film Festival
Sinais de Fogo	Luís Filipe Rocha			
1996
Adeus, Pai (Bye, Father)	Luis Felipe Rocha			
Cinco Dias, Cinco Noites (Five Days, Five Nights)	José Fonseca e Costa			
Mortinho por chegar a casa (Dying to go Home)	Carlos da Silva / George Sluizer			
Os Olhos da Ásia (The Eyes of Asia)	João Mário Grilo			
Terra Estrangeira (Foreign Land)	Walter Salles and Daniela Thomas			Co-production with Brazil
Party	Manoel de Oliveira			
1997
Le Bassin de J.W.	João César Monteiro			
Ossos (Bones)	Pedro Costa			
Tentação (Temptation)	Joaquim Leitão			
Viagem ao Princípio do Mundo (Journey to the Beginning of the World)	Manoel de Oliveira			
1998
Fintar o Destino	Fernando Vendrell			Screened at the 1998 Berlin Film Festival
Os Mutantes (The Mutants)	Teresa Villaverde			Screened at the 1998 Cannes Film Festival
Pesadelo Cor de Rosa (Sweet Nightmare)	Fernando Fragata		Romantic comedy	
River of Gold	Paulo Rocha			Screened at the 1998 Cannes Film Festival
Sapatos Pretos	João Canijo			
Zona J (Zone J)	Leonel Vieira			
Inquietude	Manoel de Oliveira			Screened at the 1998 Cannes Film Festival
1999
As Bodas de Deus (God's Wedding)	João César Monteiro			Screened at the 1999 Cannes Film Festival
Glória	Manuela Viegas			Entered into the 49th Berlin International Film Festival
Inferno (Hell)	Joaquim Leitão			
Jaime (Jaime)	António-Pedro Vasconcellos			
La Lettre	Manoel de Oliveira			Won the Jury Prize at Cannes
