= Ricardo Trêpa =

Portuguese actor

- Born: 28 October 1972 (age 53); Porto, Portugal
- Occupation: Actor
- Years active: 1990 – present

Ricardo Oliveira de Sousa Trêpa (born 28 October 1972) is a Portuguese film actor. He has appeared in over 25 films and several TV shows since 1990. He is the grandson of Portuguese film director Manoel de Oliveira and has appeared in most of his grandfather's feature films since 1990.

He was previously married to Cláudia Jacques.

== Selected filmography ==
- 1990 No, or the Vain Glory of Command
- 1991 The Divine Comedy
- 1993 Abraham's Valley
- 1994 The Box
- 1996 Party
- 1998 Anxiety
- 1999 The Letter
- 2000 Word and Utopia
- 2001 I'm Going Home
- 2001 Porto of My Childhood
- 2002 The Uncertainty Principle
- 2003 A Talking Picture
- 2004 The Fifth Empire
- 2005 Magic Mirror
- 2006 Belle Toujours
- 2007 Christopher Columbus – The Enigma
- 2009 Eccentricities of a Blonde-haired Girl
- 2010 The Strange Case of Angelica
- 2012 Gebo et l'Ombre
