= Magic Mirror (film) =

- Directed by: Manoel de Oliveira
- Written by: Manoel de Oliveira; Agustina Bessa-Luís (book)
- Produced by: Miguel Cadilhe
- Starring: Leonor Silveira; Ricardo Trêpa; Luís Miguel Cintra
- Cinematography: Renato Berta
- Edited by: Valérie Loiseleux
- Release dates: 1 September 2005 (Venice Film Festival); 9 March 2006 (Portugal); 5 April 2006 (Hong Kong International Film Festival)
- Running time: 137 minutes
- Country: Portugal
- Language: Portuguese

Magic Mirror (Portuguese: Espelho Mágico) is a 2005 Portuguese film directed by Manoel de Oliveira. It was shown in competition at the 2005 Venice Film Festival. It is based on a novel by Agustina Bessa-Luís. The film was conceived as the second part of a trilogy that begun with the 2002 film The Uncertainty Principle.

== Cast ==
- Leonor Silveira as Alfreda
- Ricardo Trêpa as José Luciano / Touro Azul
- Luís Miguel Cintra as Filipe Quinta
- Leonor Baldaque as Vicenta / Abril
- Glória de Matos as Nurse Hilda
- Isabel Ruth as Celsa Adelaide
- Adelaide Teixeira as Queta
- Diogo Dória as Police Commissioner
- José Wallenstein as Américo
- Maestro Atalaya as Prof. Oboé
- P. João Marques as Priest Feliciano (as Padre João Marques)
- Marisa Paredes as Monja
- Michel Piccoli as Prof. Heschel

== Production ==
The film was released when Oliveira was 96 year old.

== See also ==
- Cinema of Portugal
