= Fernando Vendrell =

Portuguese film director and producer (born 1962)

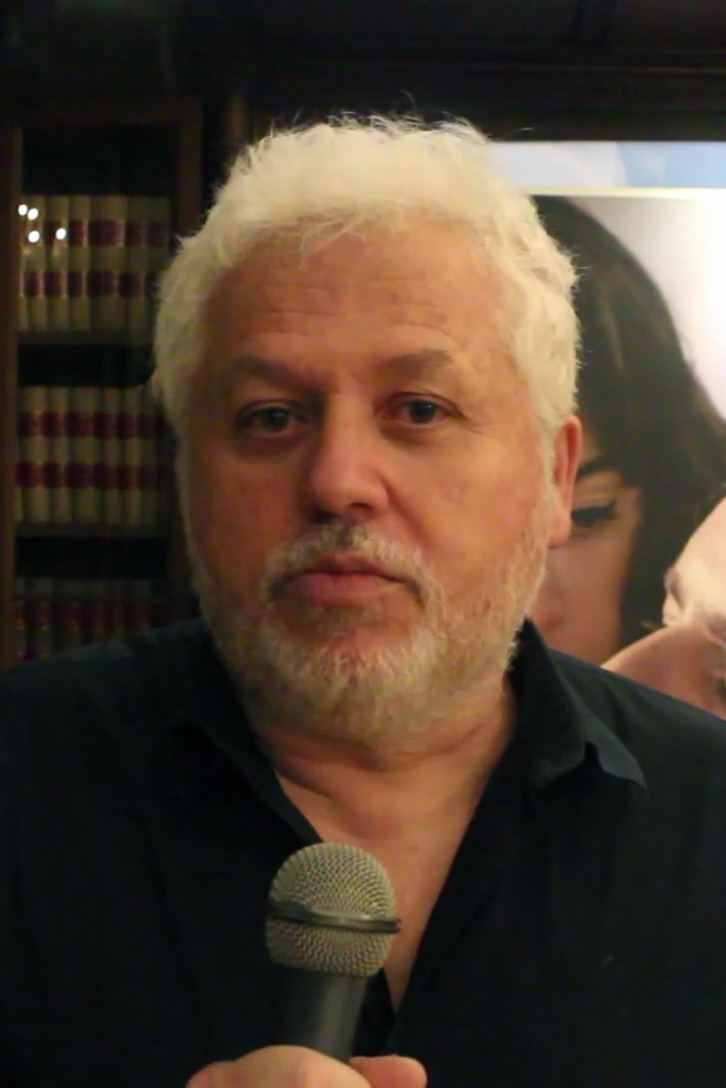
- Fernando Vendrell in 2018.
- Born: Fernando Vieira Lisboa Vendrell Henriques; October 28, 1962 (age 63); Lisbon, Portugal
- Occupations: Film director, Film producer
- Years active: 1992 – present

Fernando Vendrell (Lisbon, 1962) is a Portuguese film director and producer.

== Biography ==
Born and raised in Lisbon, where he graduated from high school in 1980 (Science). In 1981, while studying photography he worked as Film still photographer in Manoel de Oliveira documentary Lisboa Cultural.

From 1982 to 1985, he studied film editing at the Portuguese National Conservatory Conservatório Nacional, nowadays the Lisbon Theatre and Film School There he had the chance to learn with filmmakers such as António Reis, Alberto Seixas Santos and Paulo Rocha.

During the course he worked as trainee Assistant director in José Nascimento period feature film Repórter X (1984) and in Manoel de Oliveira epic feature The Satin Slipper (Le Soulier de Satin) (1984). He graduated in Film editing in 1985.

Vendrell worked then as Script supervisor in João César Monteiro À Flor do Mar and in Treasure Island with Raoul Ruiz (1985). He was Assistant director in Margarida Gil first film Relação Fiel e Verdadeira shot in Ponte de Lima (1986), and also collaborated with João Canijo in his first feature film Três Menos Eu (1986). He fulfilled his obligatory military service in the Military Film Archives, Lisbon (1986–1987). He returned to Film production to work again with Manoel de Oliveira as Assistant directorin Os Canibais (1987).

Until 1992 he worked as Assistant director with Portuguese and foreign Directors. In 1992 he concluded Arts management studies at the Instituto Nacional de Administração, Oeiras. He then started working as Production manager and Line producer in national and foreign film productions.

He worked in Animatógrafo with the producer António da Cunha Telles where he produced Fernando Trueba's Belle Époque, which won the Oscar for Best Foreign Picture in 1994. He concluded the production of O Fio do Horizonte by Fernando Lopes and O Judeu by Jom Tob Azulay.

In 1992 he founded with Luís Alvarães the independent production company David & Golias, where he works as Producer and Director.

His first film was Fintar o Destino shot in Cape Verde western Africa, and in Portugal, the film was selected to Berlin International Film Festival Berlinale, Panorama in 1998.

He produced director Zézé Gamboa's Sundance Film Festival World Dramatic Competition Award winner The Hero (2005).

== Director filmography ==
=== Feature films ===
- Fintar o Destino (1998)
- Light Drops (Portuguese: O Gotejar da Luz) (2002)
- Skin (Portuguese: Pele) (2005)
- Aparição (2018)
- Sombras Brancas (2023)

=== TV series ===
- 7 Peças Curtas (1998) - Episode "O Aniversário no Banco"
- Bocage (2006)
- O Dia do Regicídio (2008) 6 Episodes
- 3 Mulheres (2018) 13 Episodes
- 3 Mulheres Post Revolution (2022) 10 Episodes

== Producer filmography ==
=== Feature films ===
- Fintar o Destino (1998)
- The Hero (Portuguese: O Herói) (2005)
- Skin (Portuguese: Pele) (2006)
- O Grande Kilapy (2012)

=== Short films ===
- A Rua (2008)
- Cigano (2013)
