= A Caixa =

1994 film

- French poster
- Directed by: Manoel de Oliveira
- Written by: Manoel de Oliveira; Prista Monteiro (play)
- Produced by: Paulo Branco
- Starring: Luís Miguel Cintra; Glicínia Quartin; Ruy de Carvalho
- Cinematography: Mário Barroso
- Edited by: Valérie Loiseleux; Manoel de Oliveira
- Release date: 18 November 1994
- Running time: 93 minutes
- Countries: France; Portugal
- Language: Portuguese

A Caixa (lit. The Box) is a 1994 Portuguese comedy film adapted from the homonymous Hélder Prista Monteiro play by Manoel de Oliveira, who also directed the film. It was screened in competition at the 1994 Tokyo International Film Festival.

== Plot ==
Stories of various individuals living in a poor district of Lisbon are intertwined with the sad life of a blind street vendor whose only means of support is his elm box.

== Cast ==
- Luís Miguel Cintra as Blind Man
- Glicínia Quartin as Old Woman
- Ruy de Carvalho as Taverner
- Beatriz Batarda as Daughter
- Diogo Dória as Friend
- Isabel Ruth as Saleswoman
