= Leonor Silveira =

Portuguese actress (born 1970)

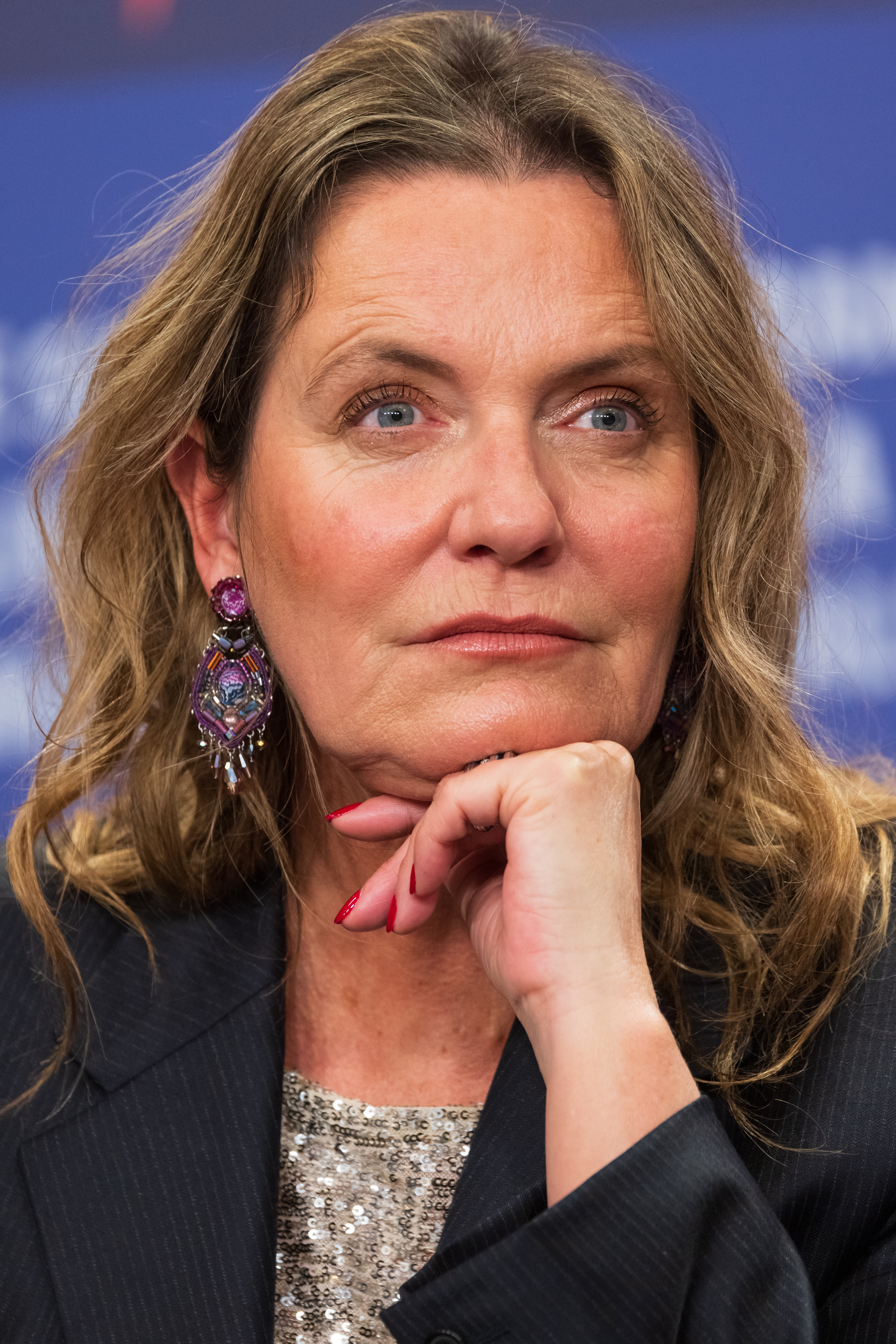
- Born: 28 October 1970 (age 55); Lisbon, Portugal
- Occupation: Actress
- Years active: 1988 – present

Leonor da Silveira Moreno e Lemos Gomes (born 28 October 1970), better known simply as Leonor Silveira, is a Portuguese film actress who made her film debut in The Cannibals for director Manoel de Oliveira in 1988. She appeared in most of Oliveira's subsequent films.

== Selected filmography ==
- 1988 The Cannibals
- 1990 No, or the Vain Glory of Command
- 1991 The Divine Comedy
- 1991 No Dia dos Meus Anos (On My Birthday)
- 1993 Abraham's Valley
- 1995 The Convent
- 1996 Party
- 1997 Voyage to the Beginning of the World
- 1998 Anxiety
- 1999 The Letter
- 2000 Word and Utopia
- 2001 I'm Going Home
- 2001 Porto of My Childhood
- 2002 The Uncertainty Principle
- 2003 A Talking Picture
- 2005 Magic Mirror
- 2006 Belle Toujours
- 2007 Christopher Columbus – The Enigma
- 2009 Eccentricities of a Blonde-haired Girl
- 2010 The Strange Case of Angelica
- 2012 Gebo and the Shadow
- 2023 Bad Living
- 2023 Living Bad

== Accolades ==
In 2021, she was selected as Jury member for International competition section of 74th Locarno Film Festival held from 4 to 14 August.
