= The Fifth Empire =

- Directed by: Manoel de Oliveira
- Written by: Manoel de Oliveira; José Régio (play)
- Produced by: Paulo Branco
- Starring: Ricardo Trêpa; Luís Miguel Cintra; Glória de Matos
- Cinematography: Sabine Lancelin
- Edited by: Valérie Loiseleux
- Release dates: 9 September 2004 (Venice Film Festival); 27 January 2005 (Portugal)
- Running time: 127 minutes
- Country: Portugal
- Language: Portuguese

The Fifth Empire (O Quinto Império – Ontem Como Hoje) is a 2004 Portuguese film directed by Manoel de Oliveira. It is one of the various film adaptations of plays by José Régio that Oliveira directed.

== Cast ==
- Ricardo Trêpa as King Sebastian I of Portugal
- Luís Miguel Cintra as Simão, Sapateiro Santo
- Glória de Matos as Rainha D. Catarina
- Miguel Guilherme as Truões
- David Almeida as Truões

== See also ==
- Cinema of Portugal
