= Diogo Dória =

Portuguese actor

- Born: 16 April 1953 (age 73); Lisbon, Portugal
- Occupation: Actor
- Years active: 1980–present

Diogo Dória (born 16 April 1953) is a Portuguese film actor who has worked in France and Portugal and is most associated with his films for director Manoel de Oliveira.

== Selected filmography ==
- 1981 Francisca
- 1985 The Satin Slipper
- 1988 The Cannibals
- 1990 No, or the Vain Glory of Command
- 1991 The Divine Comedy
- 1992 Day of Despair
- 1993 Abraham's Valley
- 1994 The Box
- 1997 Voyage to the Beginning of the World
- 1998 Anxiety
- 2000 Word and Utopia
- 2002 The Uncertainty Principle
- 2005 Magic Mirror
- 2009 Eccentricities of a Blonde-haired Girl
