= Fintar o Destino =

- Directed by: Fernando Vendrell
- Written by: Carla Baptista; Fernando Vendrell
- Produced by: Luís Alvarães; Isabel Silva
- Starring: Carlos Germano; Betina Lopes; Paulo Miranda
- Cinematography: Luís Correia
- Edited by: Pedro Ribeiro; Sandro Aguilar
- Music by: Nuno Canavarro
- Release date: 1998
- Running time: 125 minutes
- Countries: Cape Verde; Portugal
- Language: Portuguese

Fintar o Destino (formerly written as Fintar o destino, Not Heading into Destiny) is a 1998 Cape Verdean-Portuguese sports film directed by Portuguese director Fernando Vendrell. The movie features Carlos Germano, Betina Lopes and Paulo Miranda.

== Plot ==
The 50-year-old guy Mané was a resident of Mindelo on the island of São Vicente as a pubkeeper and a youth football (soccer) trainer. He is reminded each day as he was once as a successful goalkeeper. The old admiration for him is steadily disappearing. He is therefore not gaining his opportunity to switch to S.L. Benfica, the young Kalu in the team trained for his talent in which he wanted him to compete for Benfica. Against the will of his wife, he later made his trip to Lisbon. Not that he wanted to see his estranged son but for the club Benfica on the occasion of the finals match and for a chance for Kalu to participate. He also urged him to find a sportsman, who then, unlike him decides to change to Benfica. Afterwards he returned to his home island of São Vicente sobered.

== Cast ==
- Carlos Germano - Mané
- Betina Lopes - Lucy
- Paulo Miranda - Kalu
- Manuel Estevão - Djack
- Figueira Cid - Joaquim
- Daniel Martinho - Alberto
- Rita Loureiro - Julia
- Diogo Dória
- Rui Águas (guest appearance)
- António Veloso (guest appearance)

== Reception ==
The film received moderate reviews from directors that related to Lusophony Africa. The focus of the film was not on the problem on an area but its characters and different views and expectations of life, their enthusiasm on football.

The film won several awards, including a nomination in the panoramic section at the 1998 Berlin International Film Festival (also the Berlinale) and a Jury Award at the Fantasporto Film Festival.

== See also ==
- Cinema of Cape Verde
- List of Portuguese films of the 1990s
