= Manoel de Oliveira =

Portuguese film director, screenwriter and racing driver (1908–2015)

Manoel de Oliveira GCSE GCIH
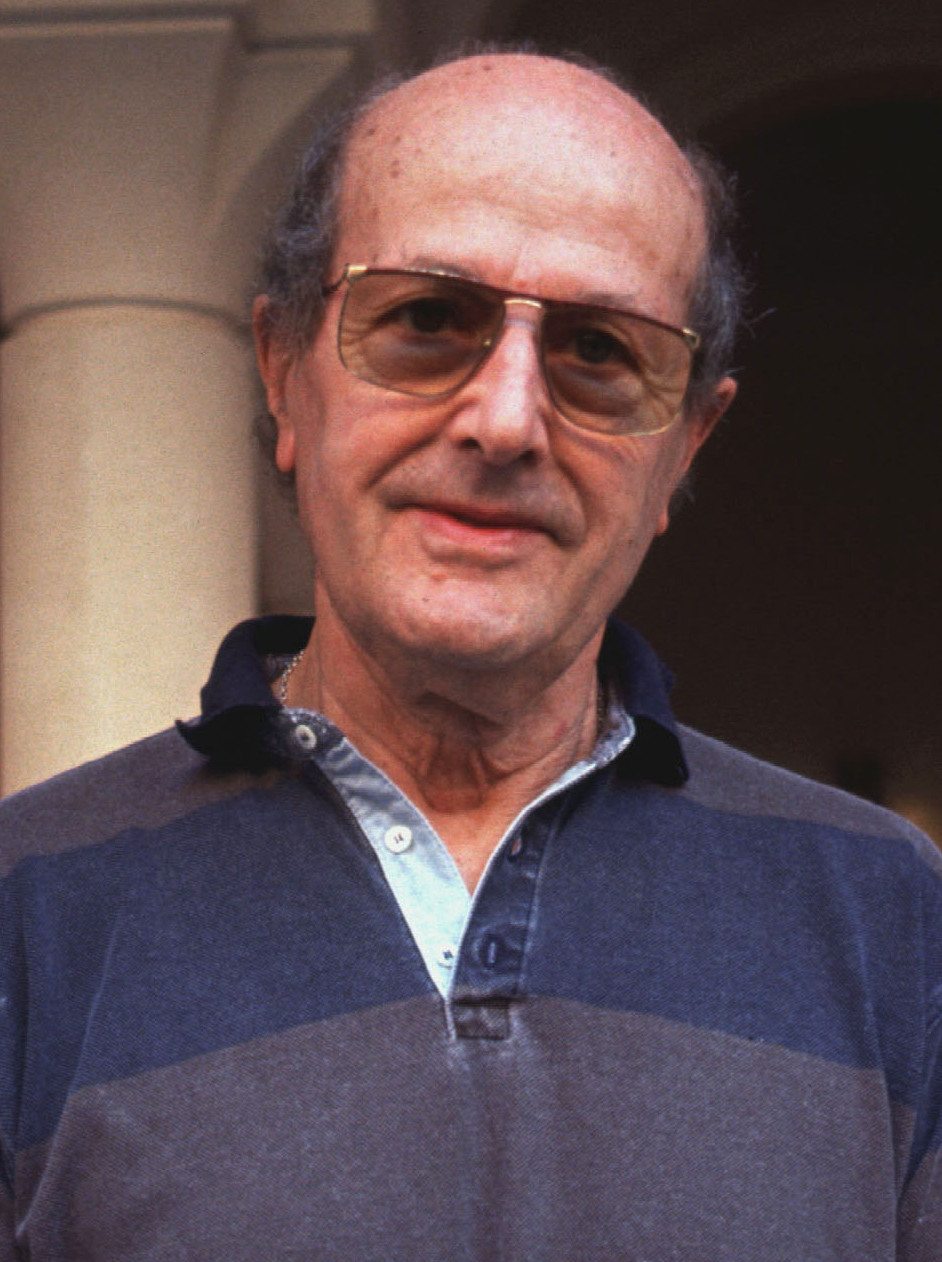
- Oliveira in 1991
- Born: Manoel Cândido Pinto de Oliveira; 11 December 1908; Porto, Portugal
- Died: 2 April 2015 (aged 106); Porto, Portugal
- Occupations: Filmmaker; actor; industrialist
- Years active: 1927–2015
- Notable work: Douro, Faina Fluvial (1931); Aniki-Bóbó (1942); Acto da Primavera (1963); Past and Present (1972); Benilde or the Virgin Mother (1975); Doomed Love (1978); Abraham's Valley (1993)
- Spouse: Maria Carvalhais (m. 1940)
- Children: 4, including Manuel Casimiro
- Relatives: Ricardo Trêpa (grandson)
- Awards: Legion of Honour; Golden Lion (2004, career); Palm d'Or (2008, honorary)

Manoel Cândido Pinto de Oliveira GCSE GCIH (Portuguese: [mɐnuˈɛl doliˈvɐjɾɐ]; 11 December 1908 – 2 April 2015) was a Portuguese film director and screenwriter born in Cedofeita, Porto. He first began making films in 1927, when he and some friends attempted to make a film about World War I. In 1931, he completed his first film Douro, Faina Fluvial, a documentary about his home city Porto made in the city-symphony genre. He made his feature film debut in 1942 with Aniki-Bóbó and continued to make shorts and documentaries for the next 30 years, gaining a minimal amount of recognition without being considered a major filmmaker.

In 1971, Oliveira directed his second feature narrative film, Past and Present, a social satire that both set the standard for his film career afterwards and gained him recognition in the global film community. He continued making films of growing ambition throughout the 1970s and 1980s, gaining critical acclaim and numerous awards. Beginning in the late 1980s, he was one of the most prolific working film directors and made an average of one film per year past the age of 100. In March 2008, he was reported to be the oldest active film director in the world. In world film history, Manoel de Oliveira was the only active filmmaker from the silent period into the digital age.

Among his numerous awards were the Golden Lion for Lifetime Achievement from the 61st Venice International Film Festival, the Special Lion for the Overall Work in the 42nd Venice International Film Festival, an Honorary Palme d'Or for his lifetime achievements in 2008 Cannes Film Festival, and the French Legion of Honor.

== Early life and education ==
Oliveira was born on 11 December 1908 in Porto, Portugal, to Francisco José de Oliveira and Cândida Ferreira Pinto. His family were wealthy industrialists and agricultural landowners. His father owned a dry-goods factory, produced the first electric light bulbs in Portugal and built an electric energy plant before he died in 1932. Oliveira was educated at the Colégio Universal in Porto before attending a Jesuit boarding school in Galicia, Spain.

As a teenager, his goal was to become an actor. At 17, he joined his brothers as an executive in his father's factories, where he remained for the majority of his adult life when not making films. In a 1981 Sight and Sound article, John Gillett describes Oliveira as having "spent most of his life in business ... making films only when circumstances allowed."

From an early age, Oliveira was interested in the poverty of the lower classes, the arts and especially films. While he named D. W. Griffith, Erich von Stroheim, Charlie Chaplin, Max Linder, Carl Dreyer's The Passion of Joan of Arc and Sergei Eisenstein's The General Line as early influences, he was also disappointed to have virtually no Portuguese filmmakers to emulate. The Portuguese film industry was also highly censored and restricted under the fascist Salazar regime that lasted from the early 1930s until the mid-1970s. His later films, such as The Cannibals and Belle Toujours (a sequel to Belle de Jour), suggest an affinity with Spanish-Mexican filmmaker Luis Buñuel. He stated "I'm closer to Buñuel. He's a reverse Catholic and I was raised a Catholic. It's a religion that permits sin, and Buñuel at the very deepest is one of the most moralistic directors but he does everything to the contrary. I never say that I'm Catholic because to be Catholic is very difficult. I prefer to be thought of as a great sinner."

== Career ==
=== 1927–1942: Early documentaries and first feature ===
Oliveira's first attempt at filmmaking was in 1927 when he and his friends worked on a film about the Portuguese participation in World War I, although the film was never made. He enrolled in Italian film-maker Rino Lupo's acting school at age 20 and appeared as an extra in Lupo's film Fátima Milagrosa. Years later, in 1933, he also had the distinction of having acted in the second Portuguese sound film, A Canção de Lisboa. Eventually, Oliveira turned his attention back to filmmaking when he saw Walther Ruttmann's documentary Berlin: Symphony of a City. Ruttman's film is the most famous of a small, short lived silent documentary film genre, the city-symphony film. These films portrays the life of a city, mainly through visual impressions in a semi-documentary style, without the narrative content of more mainstream films, though the sequencing of events can imply a kind of loose theme or impression of the city's daily life. Other examples include Alberto Cavalcanti's Rien que les heures and Dziga Vertov's Man with a Movie Camera. Oliveira said that Ruttman's film was his "most useful lesson in film technique", but that he also found it cold, mechanical and lacking humanity.

The discovery of Ruttman's film prompted Oliveira to direct his own first film in 1931, a documentary short titled Douro, Faina Fluvial. The film is a portrait of his hometown Porto and the labor and industry that takes place along the cities main river, the Douro River. Rino Lupo invited Oliveira to show the film at the International Congress of Film Critics in Lisbon, where the majority of the Portuguese audience booed. However, other foreign critics and artists who were in attendance praised the film, such as Luigi Pirandello and Émile Vuillermoz. Oliveira re-edited the film with a new soundtrack and re-released it in 1934. And again, in 1994, Oliveira modified the film by adding a new, more avant-garde soundtrack by Freitas Branco. Over the next ten years, Oliveira struggled to make films, abandoning several ambitious projects and making a handful of short documentaries on subjects ranging from artistic portraits of coastal cities in Portugal to industrial films on the origins of Portugal's auto industry. One of these shorts was a documentary about the inauguration of the hydro-electrical plant that his father built, Hulha Branca. He also first met and befriended Portuguese playwright José Régio during this time period. Oliveira would go on to adapt four of Régio's plays as films.

Fifteen years after his first attempt at filmmaking, Oliveira made his feature film debut in 1942. Aniki-Bóbó is a portrait of Porto's street children and based on a short story by Rodrigo de Freitas. Oliveira used non-professional actors to portray the children. The story centers around two young boys who compete for the attention of a young girl. One of the boys in an extroverted bully, while the other is shy and innocent. The film was a commercial failure when it opened, and its merit only came to be recognized over time. Oliveira stated that he was criticized for portraying children that lied, cheated and stole, which in his mind made them act more like adults. The film's poor reception forced Oliveira to abandon other film projects he was involved in, after which he dedicated himself to work in a vineyard that his wife had inherited. In the early 1950s, he and Régio submitted a screenplay to the Estado Novo-run Film Fund commission, but the commission refused to either accept or reject the film. Oliveira attributed this to his own well known dislike for the Salazar regime.

=== 1955–1970: Return to filmmaking ===
In 1955, Oliveira traveled to Germany to study new techniques in color cinematography. He re-emerged onto the film scene in 1956 with The Artist and the City, a twenty-six-minute documentary short film shot in color. Much like his first film, The Artist and the City is a portrait of Porto, juxtaposing color shots of the city with paintings being created by local artist António Cruz. The film was shown in a number of festivals to positive reviews. In 1959, Portugal's National Federation of Industrial Millers commissioned O Pão, a color documentary on Portugal's bread industry.

In 1963, Rite of Spring (O Acto de Primavera), a partly documentary, partly narrative film depicting an annual passion play, marked a turning point for his career. The play is based on a 16th-century passion play by Francisco Vaz de Guimarães and was actually performed by villagers in northern Portugal. Along with the performance of the play, Oliveira staged the actors rehearsals, spectators watching the actors and even himself and his crew preparing to film the performance. Oliveira said that making the film "profoundly altered his conception of cinema" as a tool not to simulate reality, but merely represent it. O Acto de Primavera was called the first political film from Portugal by film critic Henrique Costa and gave Oliveira his first worldwide recognition as a filmmaker. The film won the Grand Prix at the Siena Film Festival and Oliveira had his first film retrospective at the Locarno Film Festival in 1964.

This was shortly followed by The Hunt (A caça), a grim, surrealistic short narrative film that contrasted with the positive tones of his previous film. Due to censorship issues, Oliveira was forced to add a "happy ending" to the initial release of the film and was unable to restore his original ending until 1988. Because of this film and anti- Salazar comments Oliveira made after a screening of O Acto de Primavera, he was arrested by the PIDE in 1963. He spent ten days in jail and was interrogated until finally being released with the help of his friend Manuel Meneres. His career again slowed down and he only completed two short documentaries in the next 9 years.

In 1967, the Cineclube do Porto sponsored a Week of Portuguese Cinema, where many filmmakers from the blossoming Cinema Novo movement screened films and discussed "the precarious situation of Portuguese cinema in the marketplace, and the decline of the film club movement." This resulted in the Calouste Gulbenkian Foundation's creation of the Centro Portuges de Cinema, which would help to finance and distribute films in Portugal. The first film that the foundation chose to sponsor was Oliveira's next feature, and the early 1970s would come to be known as the Gulbenkian Years of Portuguese cinema.

=== 1970–1989: Artistic breakthrough: Tetralogy of Frustrated Love and recognition ===
From the 1970s, Oliveira was at his most active, with the vast majority of his films having been made after he turned 75. Whether a late bloomer or a victim of unfortunate delays and political censorship, he became Portugal's preeminent filmmaker during the later part of his long life. Film critic J. Hoberman has said "at an age when many men think of retirement, Oliveira emerged from obscurity as one of the 70s leading modernists, a peer of Straub, Syberberg and Duras."

With a newfound artistic freedom after António de Oliveira Salazar's stroke in 1968 and the April 1974 Carnation Revolution, Oliveira's career began to flourish and receive international acclaim. Ironically, the Carnation Revolution also resulted in his family's factories being occupied by factions of the Left and subsequently going bankrupt. Due to this, Oliveira lost most of his personal wealth and his home of thirty-five years.

Oliveira's second return to filmmaking came in 1971 with Past and Present (O Passado e o Presente), a satirical black comedy on marriage and the bourgeoisie. With its lyrical surrealism and farcical situations, the film was a shift from his earlier work about lower-class people. Based on a play by Vicente Sanches, the film stars Maria de Saisset as Vanda, a woman who only falls in love with her husbands after they have died. Past and Present was the first of what has become known as Oliveira's "Tetralogy of frustrated loves". It was followed by Benilde or the Virgin Mother, Doomed Love and Francisca. Each of these films share the theme of unfulfilled love, the backdrop of a repressive society and the beginning of Oliveira's unique cinematic style.

Benilde or the Virgin Mother (Benilde ou a Virgem Mãe) was based on a play by Oliveira's long-time friend and fellow Salazar regime dissident José Régio and released in 1975. This would be the first of many films that would examine the relationship between film and theater in Oliveira's work, and the film opens with roaming exterior shots of the Tobis Studios in Lisbon until reaching the constructed set of the film. In the film, Benilde is a sleepwalking eighteen-year-old who mysteriously becomes impregnated and believes herself to have been chosen for immaculate conception, despite the angry and dismissive reactions of her bourgeoisie family and friends. Upon its release, the film was criticized for being irrelevant to the political climate of 1975 Portugal. However, Oliveira defended its depiction of a moralistic and social repression on its characters as not being "in opposition to or in contradiction with our own times."

Doomed Love (Amor de Perdição ) is a tragic love story based on the novel by Camilo Castelo Branco. The film depicts the doomed love affair of Teresa and Simao, who come from two rival wealthy families. Teresa is sent to a convent for refusing to marry her cousin Baltasar, and after Simao kills Baltasar he is sentenced to death and eventually sent into exile. Teresa dies after Simao is sent away, and Simao dies at sea. Oliveira made two versions of the film: a six-part television miniseries that was broadcast in 1978 to disastrous reviews, and a shorter theatrical film released in 1979, which received rave reviews and was profiled on the cover of Le Monde. Oliveira stated that whereas most film adaptations of literature attempt to adapt the narrative to film, he wanted instead to adapt "the text" of Branco's novel, much like Jean-Marie Straub and Daniele Huillet's The Chronicle of Anna Magdalena Bach was a film more about music itself than about its own story. He stated that "in a novel where a lot happens, it would be a waste of time to show everything. Besides, the literary narration, the way of telling the story, the style, the sonorousness of the phrases, [and] the composition are all just as beautiful and interesting as the events that unfold. Therefore, it seemed convenient for me to focus on the text, and that is what I did." The film achieves this idea by including extensive narration, characters that speak their thoughts or read letters aloud and shots of written text.

In 1981, Oliveira made Francisca, based on the novel by Agustina Bessa-Luís. The film is a tragic love triangle detailing a real life relationship between Fanny Owen, Amor de Perdição author Camilo Castelo Branco and Branco's best friend Jose Augusto. Oliveira's wife was a distant relative of Owen and had access to private letter's written by all three protagonists in the film. The film was screened to great acclaim at the Director's Fortnight at the 1981 Cannes Film Festival and furthered Oliveira's global recognition.

In addition to Francisca, Oliveira adapted six other novels or stories from author Agustina Bessa-Luís, as well as collaborated on the screenplay for the documentary Visita ou Memórias e Confissões. This was also the first film which Oliveira made with producer Paulo Branco, who would go on to produce the majority of Oliveira's film, and with actor Diogo Dória.

Following the success of Francisca, Oliveira made three documentary films. Visit or Memories and Confessions is an autobiographical documentary about Oliveira's family history. After completing the film, he decided that it will not be released until after his death. He made Lisboa Cultural and Nice... À Propos de Jean Vigo , a documentary for French television on the city of Nice, and also a tribute to French filmmaker Jean Vigo.

Oliveira then made his most ambitious film to that date, The Satin Slipper (Le Soulier de Satin), based on the notorious 1929 epic play by Paul Claudel, which is rarely performed in its entirety due to its length. The seven-hour film took Oliveira two years to complete. It was Oliveira's first film in French, as well as his first film with actor Luís Miguel Cintra, who would go on to act in all of his films from then on. The story of The Satin Slipper is about the unrequited love of sixteenth-century conquistador Don Rodrigue and nobelwoman Dona Prouheze with the backdrop of colonialism in Africa and the Americas. The film opens with a theater gradually being filled with an audience and an introduction to the film on stage. The film itself uses very theatrical set pieces, such as cardboard waves and backdrops. The film was never released theatrically, but was screened at both the 1985 Cannes Film Festival and the 1985 Venice Film Festival, where Oliveira received a special Golden Lion for his career up to that point. Later, the Brussels Cinematheque awarded the film its L'Âge d'or Prize.

In 1986, Oliveira made one of his most experimental films, My Case (Mon Cas), partially based on José Régio's one act play O Meu Caso, although the film also takes inspiration from Samuel Beckett's Fizzles and the Book of Job. Oliveira takes a surreal and meta-narrative approach to examine the relationship between art and life. The film begins with a theater being filled with the audience and actors before a play is about to begin. A mysterious man play by Luis Miguel Cintra enters the stage and presents "his case" about the fallacies of theater and its illusions. One by one, all of the play's actors and technicians state their cases about what bothers them about the play and its relation to their own lives. An audience member then takes the stage to make a case for what the collective audience wants. This is followed by three consecutive but very different versions of the one act play: the first is a straightforward farce, the second is presented as a slapstick silent movie, and the third is performed with the dialogue read backwards. The stage performance ends with video footage of war and disasters from around the world and Pablo Picasso's painting Guernica. The entire film then shifts to a retelling of the Book of Job, with Cintra as Job and Bulle Ogier as his wife. This sequence ends with a close-up of Leonardo da Vinci's Mona Lisa. My Case opened the 1986 Venice Film Festival and was released in 1987.

Oliveira next made a satirical film in the tradition of Luis Buñuel, The Cannibals (Os Canibais) in 1988. The film is based on a short story by Álvaro Carvalhal and stars Luis Miguel Cintra, Leonor Silveira and Diogo Dória. José Régio first showed Oliveira the little known story, and Oliveira decided to make the film his only opera in collaboration with composer Joao Paes. The film also contains a demonic narrator Niccolo who appears and disappears from scenes magically. In the film, the beautiful young Margarida (Silveira) falls in love with the mysterious Viscount of Aveleda (Cintra), while rejecting the advances of the notorious Don João (Dória). On their wedding night, the Viscount reveals to Margarida that his great mystery is that he has no arms or legs and is "a living corpse". Margarida throws herself out of their bedroom window in horror and the Viscount attempts to drink poison but rolls into the fireplace instead, singing an aria as he burns to death. Just then Don João enters intending to murder the Viscount in jealously and witnesses the Viscounts death. The next morning, Margarida's father, brothers and family magistrate wake up and want to be served breakfast, but find an empty house. They look for the Viscount, but only discover a strange meat cooking in the fireplace, and conclude that it is a strange delicacy being prepared for them. The four men unknowingly eat the Viscount's body for breakfast with great delight. Suddenly they hear a gunshot and rush to the garden where they find Margarida's dead body and Don João sitting next to her with a self- inflicted gunshot wound in his chest. As Don João dies, he explains everything that has happened to the family and tells them they can find the Viscount in the fireplace. Horrified at their own cannibalism, the father and brother's decide to commit suicide until the magistrate points out that they are now the sole heirs to the Viscount's fortune. The father and brother's decide to live, and turn into rabid dogs and eat the magistrate, who has turned into a pig. The Cannibals was screened in competition at the 1988 Cannes Film Festival and won the Critics Special award at the 1988 São Paulo International Film Festival.

=== 1990–2014: Continued success as a filmmaker ===
Oliveira's work since the 1990s was the most prolific of his entire career and he made at least one film a year (usually feature narratives but sometimes shorts or documentaries) between 1990 and 2012. During this period he established and consistently worked with a loyal troupe of regular actors including his grandson Ricardo Trêpa, Luís Miguel Cintra, Leonor Baldaque, Leonor Silveira, Diogo Dória, John Malkovich, Catherine Deneuve and Michel Piccoli. He also worked with international stars such as Jeanne Moreau, Irene Papas, Bulle Ogier, Chiara Mastroianni and Marcello Mastroianni in the actor's last film.

In 1990, Oliveira directed No, or the Vain Glory of Command (Non, ou a Vã Glória de Mandar), starring Cintra, Dória and Silveira. The film depicts the military history of Portugal, focusing on its defeats over its victories. The film's historical action includes the assassination of Viriathus, the Battle of Toro, the Battle of Alcácer Quibir and the Portuguese Colonial War. The only exception to the historical scenes is a sequence depicting the mythical Isle of Love, which celebrates Portuguese explorers and discoverers, instead of its military figures. The Isle of Love features winged cupids, beautiful nymphs and the goddess Venus. The film competed at the 1990 Cannes Film Festival. In 1991, Oliveira directed The Divine Comedy (A Divina Comédia). Set in a mental institution, the film is not an adaptation of Dante Alighieri's famous work but derived from stories on the Bible, José Régio's play A Salvação do Mundo, Fyodor Dostoyevsky's Crime and Punishment and The Brothers Karamazov, and Friedrich Nietzsche's Antichrist. Oliveira stated that all of the texts he uses "deal in some way with the problem of sin and the possibility of redemption, and in this sense they all derive ultimately from the same source." The film stars Maria de Medeiros, Miguel Guilherme, Luís Miguel Cintra, Leonor Silveira and Diogo Dória and competed at the 1991 Venice Film Festival, where it won the Grand Special Jury Prize award.

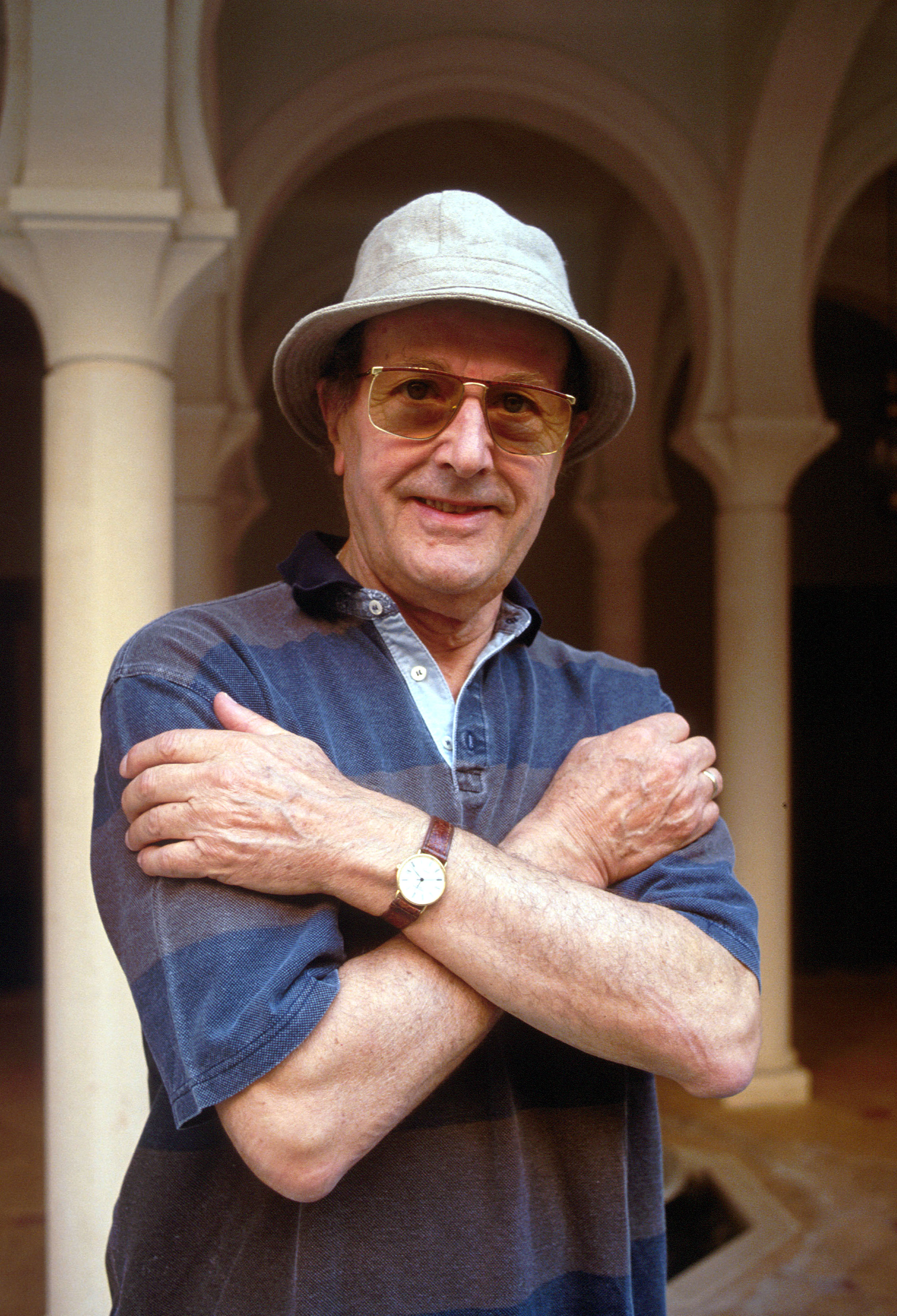
Oliveira at the 48th Venice International Film Festival, 1991

In 1992, Oliveira returned to the adaptation of works by Portuguese writer Camilo Castelo Branco with Day of Despair (O Dia do Desespero). The film stars Mário Barroso as Branco, with actors Teresa Madruga, Luís Miguel Cintra and Diogo Dória playing both themselves and Ana Plácido, Freitas Fortuna and Dr. Edmundo Magalhães, respectively. The film was shot in the house where Branco lived his final years and committed suicide and is both a documentary and a narrative film about the famous Portuguese writer. In 1993 Oliveira made Abraham's Valley (Vale Abraão), based on the novel by Agustina Bessa-Luís. Oliveira had wanted to film Gustave Flaubert's Madame Bovary, but was dissuaded by producer Paulo Branco due to budgetary restraints. Oliveira then suggested to Bessa-Luís that she write an updated version of the novel set in Portugal, which resulted in the novel in 1991. Abraham's Valley is not a retelling of the Flaubert book, however Madame Bovary is both a subtext and a physical presence in the film. The film stars Leonor Silveira as Ema, a discontent Portuguese woman who wants a passionate life like the one she reads about in Flaubert's novel. Like Madame Bovary, Ema marries a doctor that she does not love and has many extramarital affairs before dying in an accident that may or may not be a suicide. Unlike Madame Bovary, there is no scandal in her love affairs, which are simply accepted by both her husband and the society that she lives in. The film won the Critics award at the 1993 São Paulo International Film Festival, as well as an award for Best Artistic Contribution Award at the 1993 Tokyo International Film Festival. In 1994, Oliveira made The Box (A Caixa), based on a play by Hélder Prista Monteiro. The film stars Luis Miguel Cintra as a blind homeless man whose only means of support in a poor neighborhood in Lisbon is his official, government issued alms box. It was screened in competition at the 1994 Tokyo International Film Festival.

In 1995, Oliveira's reputation had grown and his films were internationally acclaimed. That year, he made his first of many films starring international movie stars: The Convent (O Convento), starring John Malkovich and Catherine Deneuve. The film is based on the novel As Terras Do Risco by Agustina Bessa-Luís and examines the Faustian theme of good versus evil. In the film, Malkovich plays an American writer who travels to Portugal with his wife (Deneuve) to research his theory that William Shakespeare was really Jacques Perez, a Jewish Spaniard who fled his native country to avoid the Spanish Inquisition. The couple stay in a monastery with strange, demonic-looking staff, and they eventually end up having affairs with two staff members. The film was screened in competition at the 1995 Cannes Film Festival and won the Prize of the Catalan Screenwriter's Critic and Writer's Association at the 1995 Sitges - Catalan International Film Festival. In 1996, Oliveira worked with French star Michel Piccoli and Greek film star Irene Papas in Party. The film was co-written by Oliveira and Agustina Bessa-Luís from an original idea by Oliveira. In the film, a married couple played by Leonor Silveira and Rogério Samora have a dinner party that includes a famous Greek actress (Papas) and her lover (Piccoli) and the film consists of conversations between these four characters at parties over the course of five years. The film was screened in competition at the 1996 Venice Film Festival and won Oliveira the award for Best Director at the 1996 Portuguese Golden Globe Awards.

In 1997, Oliveira made Voyage to the Beginning of the World (Viagem ao Princípio do Mundo), which was the final film of Italian film star Marcello Mastroianni. In the film Mastroianni plays an aging film director named Manoel who travels on a road trip across Northern Portugal with French film actor Afonso (Jean-Yves Gautier) and two other young companions, Judite (Leonor Silveira) and Duarte (Diogo Dória). Afonso wants to see the Portuguese village that his father grew up in and see the relatives that he has never met. On the way, Manoel stops at several locations on the road that he remembers from his childhood, only to find them much different than he had remembered. The film is autobiographical in that the locations on the road are real locations from Oliveira's childhood. The film is also based on the experiences of actor Yves Afonso, whose father had immigrated from Portugal to France and who had met his long lost relatives during a French-Portuguese co-production in 1987. The film was screened out of competition at the 1997 Cannes Film Festival and won the FIPRESCI Prize and a Special Mention from the Ecumenical Jury. It won other awards at the 1997 Haifa International Film Festival and the 1997 Tokyo International Film Festival.

Oliveira then made Anxiety (Inquietude) in 1998. The episodic film contains three short films based on literary works by Helder Prista Monteiro (Os Immortais), António Patrício (Suzy) and Agustina Bessa-Luís (Mãe de Um Rio). In Os Immortais, a 90-year-old man (José Pinto) concludes that old age is horrible and attempts to convince his middle aged son (Luís Miguel Cintra) to commit suicide. In Suzy, an aristocrat (Diogo Dória) has an affair with a beautiful young cocotte (Leonor Silveira), but social class differences prevent him from having a deep, meaningful relationship with her. In Mãe de Um Rio, Leonor Baldaque plays a discontent small town girl who yearns for a more exotic life and seek advice from the Mother of the River (Irene Papas). The film won Oliveira another award for Best Director at the 1998 Portuguese Golden Globe Awards. In 1999, Oliveira made The Letter (La Lettre), based on the 17th century French novel The Princess of Cleves by Madame de Lafayette. Oliveira had wanted to make a film from the novel since the late 1970s, but had initially thought that it was too complicated to be filmed. It updates the novel to modern day and stars Chiara Mastroianni as Catherine de Clèves, Antoine Chappey as the husband that she does not love, Leonor Silveira as her childhood friend who has become a nun and her confidant, and Portuguese rock star Pedro Abrunhosa playing himself in the role of the dashing Duke of Nemours, whom Catherine is in love with. Abrunhosa also wrote some original songs for the film. The film won the Grand Jury Prize at the 1999 Cannes Film Festival.

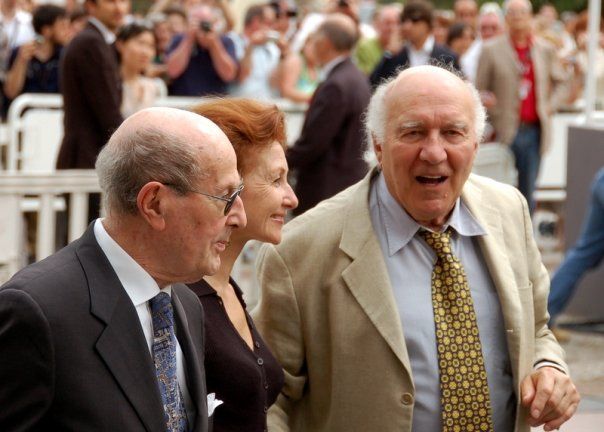
Oliveira and Michel Piccoli at the 2001 Cannes Film Festival

In 2000, Oliveira made the film Word and Utopia (Palavra e Utopia), a biography of the Portuguese Jesuit priest Padre António Vieira, based upon letters and sermons that the priest wrote between 1626 and 1695. Vieira is played by Oliveira's grandson Ricardo Trêpa as a young man, Luis Miguel Cintra in middle age and Lima Duarte as an old man. The film chronicles Vieira's missionary work in South America, testimony before the Spanish Inquisition and work as a trusted advisor to Queen Christina of Sweden (Leonor Silveira). It was shown in competition at the 2000 Venice Film Festival, where it won the Film critica "Bastone Bianco" Award. It also won Oliveira his third award for Best Director at the 2000 Portuguese Golden Globe Awards. In 2001, Oliveira made two feature films at the age of 92. I'm Going Home (Je rentre à la maison) stars Michel Piccoli as Gilbert Valence, an aging stage actor that never achieved great success who deals with the sudden deaths of his wife, daughter and son-in-law after a car accident, turning down undignified roles in commercial TV shows and raising his nine-year-old grandson. Catherine Deneuve, John Malkovich, Antoine Chappey, Leonor Baldaque, Leonor Silveira and Ricardo Trêpa also co-star. The film was shown in competition at the 2001 Cannes Film Festival, won awards at the Haifa International Film Festival and the São Paulo International Film Festival, and won the award for Best Film at the 2001 Portuguese Golden Globe Awards. Later that year, Oliveira made the autibiographical, partially documentary film Porto of My Childhood (Porto da Minha Infância). The film includes archival footage of Douro, Faina Fluvial and Aniki-Bóbó, reenactments of parts of Oliveira's childhood and documentary footage of Porto in the early 20th century. Oliveira's grandsons Jorge Trêpa and Ricardo Trêpa portray Oliveira at different ages of his life. The film was screened in competition at the 2001 Venice Film Festival, where it won the UNESCO Award.

Oliveira made The Uncertainty Principle (O Princípio da Incerteza) in 2002. It is based on the 2001 novel O Princípio da Incerteza: Jóia de Família by Agustina Bessa-Luís, which won the Grand Prize from the Portuguese Writer's Association. In the film, Leonor Baldaque plays Camila, who marries a man (Ivo Canelas) to help alleviate her family's financial difficulties instead of her boyfriend (Ricardo Trêpa). Camila's husband begins an affair with Vanessa (Leonor Silveira), which Camila is indifferent about. This infuriates Vanessa who proceeds to do everything she can to make Camila suffer. In the end, Vanessa and Camila's husband become involved with an illegal deal with some gangsters, which Camila refuses to help them with. The film was screened in competition at the 2002 Cannes Film Festival. This was followed by A Talking Picture (Um Filme Falado), starring Leonor Silveira, Filipa de Almeida, Catherine Deneuve, John Malkovich, Irene Papas and Stefania Sandrelli in 2003. In the film, Silveira takes her young daughter (Almeida) on a cruise to Bombay to meet her father's family and teaches her about the history of the places that they pass through along the way. These sights include such places as Ceuta, Marseille, Athens, Naples and Pompeii. They also meet and learn about three successful women (Deneuve, Papas and Sandrelli) from certain location and have long conversations with the ship's captain (Malkovich), often dealing with the conflicts between Christianity and Islam. The film was screened in competition at the 2003 Venice Film festival, where it won the SIGNIS Award.

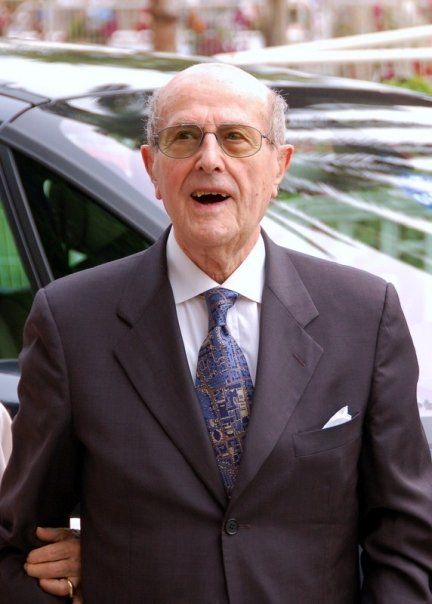
Oliveira at the 2001 Cannes Film Festival

In 2004, Oliveira made The Fifth Empire (O Quinto Império – Ontem Como Hoje), a highly political film based on the play El-Rey Sebastião by José Régio. The film chronicles the history of King Sebastian I of Portugal, and at a screening at the 2004 Venice Film Festival Oliveira acknowledged that US President George W. Bush had "a "Sebastianist" inclination in his expressed desire to spread democracy and freedom around the globe in his own version of the Fifth Empire." In the film, King Sebastian (Ricardo Trêpa) contemplates pursuing his crusade in the Middle East that would lead to the Battle of Alcácer Quibir (where he would eventually die) and the counsel that he seeks from a variety of advisors, friends and family members. It portrays King Sebastian as obsessed with his place in history and with his own myth of himself, while creating violent situations all around him. The film was screened at Venice out of competition as part of Oliveira's Career Golden Lion award. Oliveira followed this with Magic Mirror (Espelho Mágico) in 2005. Based on the novel A Alma dos Ricos by Agustina Bessa-Luís, the film stars Leonor Silveira, Ricardo Trêpa, Luís Miguel Cintra, Leonor Baldaque and Michel Piccoli in a cameo, but was produced by José Miguel Cadilhe instead of Paulo Branco. In the film, Silveira plays a wealthy woman who is determined to see a real apparition of the Virgin Mary with the help of Trêpa, who has recently been released from prison.

In 2006, Oliveira made Belle Toujours, a sequel to Luis Buñuel's 1967 film, Belle de Jour. The film stars Bulle Ogier as Séverine Serizy and Michel Piccoli reprising his original role of Henri Husson. In the film, Séverine reluctantly agrees to see Henri for the first time in forty years out of curiosity to know if her former blackmailer told her dying husband about her secret life as a prostitute. Ricardo Trêpa and Leonor Baldaque also appear in supporting roles.

Oliveira's 2007 film Christopher Columbus - The Enigma (Cristóvão Colombo – O Enigma) was shot partly in New York and starred Ricardo Trêpa. In 2009, Oliveira made Eccentricities of a Blonde-Haired Girl (Singularidades de uma Rapariga Loura), based on a short story by Eça de Queirós. The film starred Ricardo Trêpa and Catarina Wallenstein, who won Best Actress at the 2009 Portuguese Golden Globe Awards. Oliveira's 2010 film The Strange Case of Angelica starred Spanish actress Pilar López de Ayala and was entered into the Un Certain Regard section of the 2010 Cannes Film Festival.

Oliveira's last feature film, Gebo and the Shadow, was released in 2012 and premiered at the 69th Venice International Film Festival. The film stars Michael Lonsdale, Jeanne Moreau, Claudia Cardinale, Leonor Silveira, Ricardo Trêpa and Luís Miguel Cintra and is based on the play The Hunchback and His Shadow by Raul Brandão.

In November 2013, he announced production of the short film The Old Man of Belem, pending government funding. This was his last completed film and premiered at the 71st Venice International Film Festival and was released in Porto in November 2014. Oliveira originally intended to shoot the film on a studio set, but because of his failing health it was shot in a garden close to his home in Porto. It was based on the novel The Penitent by Portuguese writer Teixeira de Pascoaes and starred Luís Miguel Cintra as Luís de Camões, Ricardo Trêpa as Don Quixote, Mário Barroso as Camilo Castelo Branco and Diogo Dória as Teixeira de Pascoaes. Some short clips from his previous films were edited into the short film, but he stated that it was neither an "overview" of his life's work nor a "farewell" to filmmaking. It was shot by cinematographer Renato Berta and edited by Valérie Loiseleux.

== Honors and decorations ==
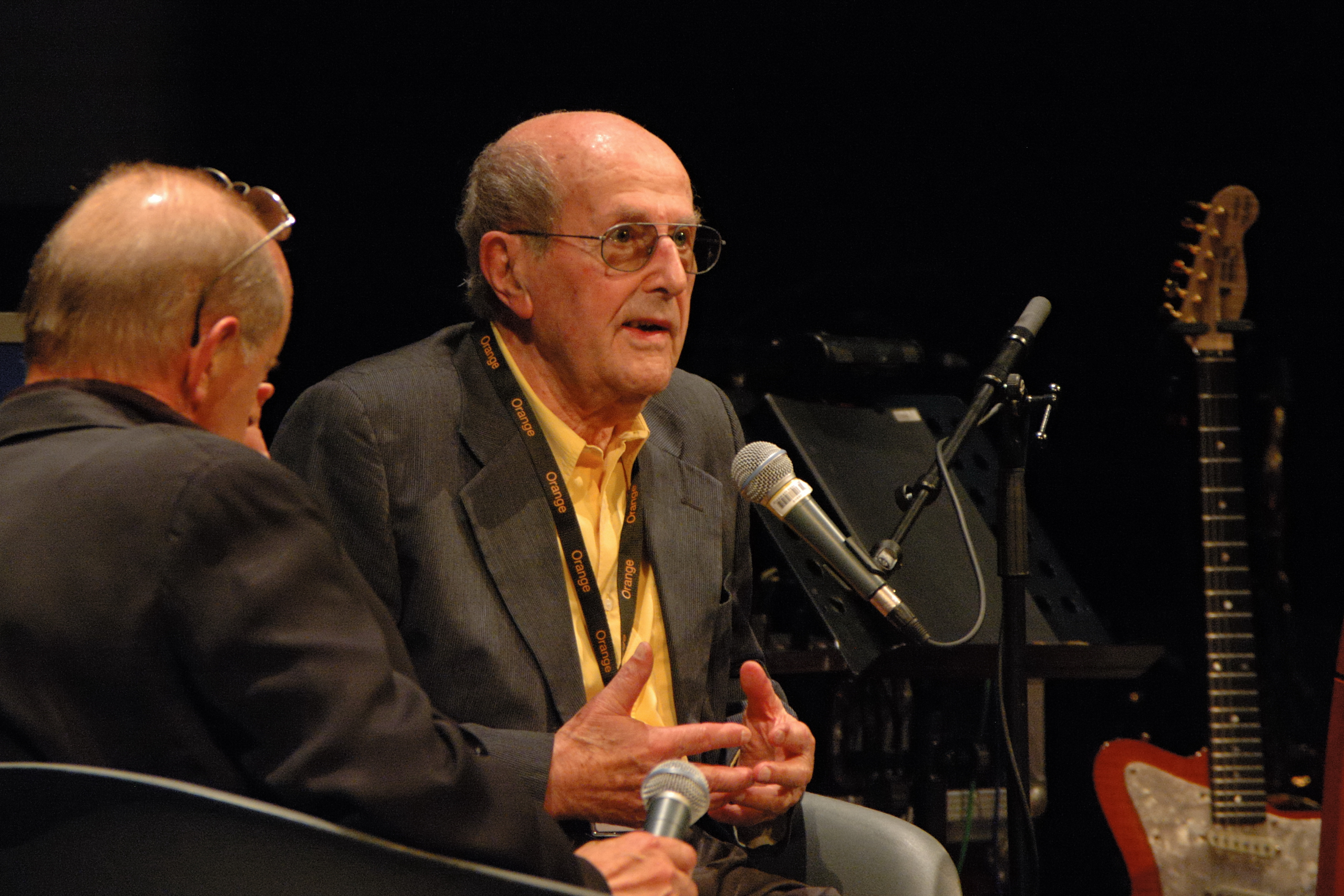
Oliveira answering Antonio Tabucchi at the Cinémathèque Française on July 3, 2008

In 1989 and in 2008, Oliveira was awarded doctorate degrees honoris causa by the University of Porto and by the University of the Algarve. He was also awarded the Order of St. James of the Sword by the President of Portugal. In addition, he received multiple honours such as those of the Cannes, Venice and Montréal film festivals. He was awarded two Career Golden Lions, in 1985 and 2004, and an Honorary Golden Palm for his lifetime achievements in 2008.

In 2002, Portuguese architect Eduardo Souto de Moura completed "Cinema House" in Porto, which was designed to commemorate the work of Oliveira.

In November 2012, Oliveira was honored with a week-long tribute and retrospective at the 16th Citéphilo in Lille, France. In March 2013, Oliveira attended a screening of Aniki-Bóbó at the International Film Festival of Porto, which commemorated the 70th anniversary of the film.

On December 10, 2014, Oliveira was appointed grand officier of the French Légion d’Honneur in a ceremony conducted by France's ambassador to Portugal at the Museu da Fundação Serralves in Porto.

== Personal life ==
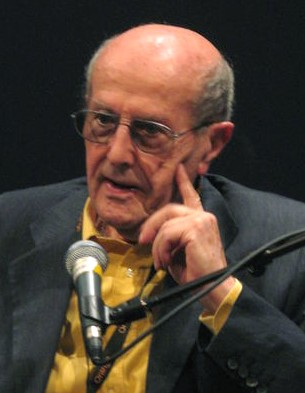
Oliveira in 2008

Manoel de Oliveira married Maria Isabel Brandão de Meneses de Almeida Carvalhais (1 September 1918 - 11 September 2019) in Porto on December 4, 1940. They remained married for nearly 75 years and had four children; their two sons are Manuel Casimiro Brandão Carvalhais de Oliveira (a painter born in 1941 known as Manuel Casimiro), Jose Manuel Brandão Carvalhais de Oliveira (born 1944), and their two daughters Maria Isabel Brandão Carvalhais de Oliveira (born 1947) and Adelaide Maria Brandão Carvalhais de Oliveira (born 1948). They have several grandchildren, including actor Ricardo Trêpa through his youngest daughter.

In his younger days, Oliveira competed as a race car driver. During the 1937 Grand Prix season, he competed in and won the International Estoril Circuit race, driving a Ford V8 Special.

Manoel de Oliveira, at the age of 101, was chosen to give the welcoming speech at Pope Benedict XVI's meeting with representatives of the Portuguese cultural world on May 12, 2010, at the Belém Cultural Center. In the speech, titled "Religion and Art", he said that morality and art may well have derived from the religious attempt at "an explanation of the existence of human beings" with regard to their "concrete insertion in the Cosmos". The arts "have always been strictly linked to religions" and Christianity has been "prodigal in artistic expressions". In an interview published the day before, Oliveira, who was raised a Catholic, said that, "doubts or not, the religious aspect of life has always accompanied me," and added, "All my films are religious."

For several years before Oliveira's death, a feature film called A Igreja do Diabo (The Church of the Devil) was in development. In an interview conducted less than five months before his death, Oliveira revealed that he had plans for future films.

== Declining health and death ==
In July 2012, Oliveira spent a week in hospital to treat a respiratory infection and congestive heart failure. Oliveira died in Porto on 2 April 2015, aged 106. He was survived by a wife, four children, and numerous grandchildren and great-grandchildren.

== Filmography ==
=== Feature films ===
Year	English title	Original title	Notes
1942	Aniki-Bóbó		
1963	Rite of Spring	Acto da Primavera	
1972	Past and Present	O Passado e o Presente	
1975	Benilde or the Virgin Mother	Benilde ou a Virgem Mãe	
1978	Doomed Love	Amor de Perdição	
1981	Francisca		
1985	The Satin Slipper	Le Soulier de satin	French-language debut
1986	My Case	O meu caso	
1988	The Cannibals	Os Canibais	
1990	No, or the Vain Glory of Command	Non, ou a Vã Glória de Mandar	
1991	The Divine Comedy	A Divina Comédia	Special Jury Prize winner at the 48th Venice International Film Festival
1992	Day of Despair	O Dia do Desespero	
1993	Abraham's Valley	Vale Abraão	
1994	The Box	A Caixa	
1995	The Convent	O Convento	
1996	Party		
1997	Voyage to the Beginning of the World	Viagem ao Princípio do Mundo	
1998	Anxiety	Inquietude	
1999	The Letter	A Carta	Jury Prize winner at the 1999 Cannes Film Festival
2000	Word and Utopia	Palavra e Utopia	
2001	I'm Going Home	Je rentre à la maison	
2001	Porto of My Childhood	Porto da Minha Infância	
2002	The Uncertainty Principle	O Princípio da Incerteza	
2003	A Talking Picture	Um Filme Falado	
2004	The Fifth Empire	O Quinto Império – Ontem Como Hoje	
2005	Magic Mirror	Espelho Mágico	
2006	Belle Toujours		
2007	Christopher Columbus – The Enigma	Cristóvão Colombo - O Enigma	
2009	Eccentricities of a Blonde-Haired Girl	Singularidades de uma Rapariga Loura	
2010	The Strange Case of Angelica	O Estranho Caso de Angélica	
2012	Gebo and the Shadow	O Gebo e a Sombra	Last feature film

=== Documentaries and shorts ===
- 1931 Douro, Faina Fluvial
- 1932 Hulha Branca
- 1932 Estátuas de Lisboa
- 1937 Os Últimos Temporais: Cheias do Tejo
- 1938 Miramar, Praia das Rosas
- 1938 Já se fabricam automóveis em Portugal
- 1941 Famalicão
- 1956 The Artist and the City
- 1958 O Coração
- 1959 O Pão
- 1963 The Hunt (short narrative)
- 1964 Villa Verdinho: Uma Aldeia Transmontana
- 1965 As Pinturas do meu Irmão Júlio
- 1982 Visit or Memories and Confessions
- 1983 Lisboa Cultural
- 1983 Nice... À Propos de Jean Vigo
- 1986 Simpósio Internacional de Escultura em Pedra
- 1988 A Propósito da Bandeira Nacional
- 2002 Momento (short)
- 2005 Do Visível ao Invisível (short)
- 2006 O Improvável não é Impossível (short)
- 2007 Rencontre Unique (short segment from To Each His Own Cinema)
- 2008 O Vitral e a Santa Morta (short)
- 2008 Romance de Vila do Conde (short)
- 2010 Painéis de São Vicente de Fora, Visão Poética
- 2011 Do Visível ao Invisível (short segment from Mundo Invisível)
- 2012 O Conquistador Conquistado (segment from Centro Histórico)
- 2014 O Velho do Restelo (The Old Man of Belem)
- 2015 Um Século de Energia (short documentary)

== Sources ==
- Manoel de Oliveira by Randal Johnson. University of Illinois Press. Contemporary Film Directors series. 2007.
