= Louco Amor =

Louco Amor may refer to:

- Louco Amor (Portuguese TV series), a 2012-2013 telenovela
- Louco Amor (Brazilian TV series), a 1983 telenovela
