= Christopher Columbus – The Enigma =

- Portuguese: Cristóvão Colombo – O Enigma
- Directed by: Manoel de Oliveira
- Written by: Manoel de Oliveira
- Based on: Cristovão Colon era Português by Manuel da Silva and Sílvia da Silva
- Produced by: François d'Artemare
- Starring: Ricardo Trêpa; Leonor Baldaque; Manoel de Oliveira; Maria Isabel de Oliveira
- Cinematography: Sabine Lancelin
- Edited by: Valérie Loiseleux
- Music by: José Luís Borges Coelho
- Production companies: Filmes do Tejo; Les Films de l'Après-Midi; ZDF/Arte; Rádio e Televisão de Portugal (RTP); Fundação Luso-Americana; Tobis Portuguesa; Instituto Camões
- Distributed by: Rézo Films (France)
- Release dates: 6 September 2007 (Venice); 10 January 2008 (Portugal); 3 September 2008 (France)
- Running time: 75 minutes
- Countries: Portugal; France; Germany
- Languages: Portuguese; English
- Budget: $2 million

Christopher Columbus – The Enigma (Portuguese: Cristóvão Colombo – O Enigma) is a 2007 docudrama film written, directed, and starring Manoel de Oliveira, based on the novel Cristovão Colon era Português by Manuel Luciano da Silva and Sílvia Jorge da Silva.

A co-production of Portugal, France, and Germany, it stars Ricardo Trêpa and Oliveira as Manuel Luciano, a renowned Portuguese doctor, who after immigrating to the United States in the 1940s, is led into the mystery surrounding Christopher Columbus and his birthplace.

The film had its world premiere out of competition of the 64th Venice International Film Festival on 6 September 2007. It was theatrically released in Portugal on 10 January 2008.

== Cast ==
- Ricardo Trêpa as Manuel Luciano (1946–60)
  - Manoel de Oliveira as Manuel Luciano (2007)
- Leonor Baldaque as Sílvia (1957–60)
  - Maria Isabel de Oliveira as Sílvia (2007)
- Jorge Trêpa as Hermínio
- Lourença Baldaque as O Anjo
- Leonor Silveira as Mãe
- Luís Miguel Cintra as Director Museu Porto Santo

== See also ==
- Cinema of Portugal
