= Word and Utopia =

- Directed by: Manoel de Oliveira
- Written by: Manoel de Oliveira
- Produced by: Paulo Branco
- Starring: Lima Duarte; Luís Miguel Cintra; Ricardo Trêpa
- Cinematography: Renato Berta
- Edited by: Valérie Loiseleux
- Release date: 17 November 2000 (Portugal)
- Running time: 130 minutes
- Country: Portugal
- Language: Portuguese

Word and Utopia (Palavra e Utopia) is a 2000 Portuguese film directed by Manoel de Oliveira. It was screened in competition at the 2000 Venice Film Festival.

== Cast ==
- Lima Duarte as Padre António Vieira (Old)
- Luís Miguel Cintra as Padre António Vieira (Middle Years)
- Ricardo Trêpa as Padre António Vieira (Young)
- Miguel Guilherme as Padre Jose Soares
- Leonor Silveira as Christina, Queen of Sweden
- Renato De Carmine as Jeronimo Cattaneo
- Diogo Dória as Chief Inquisitor

== Awards ==
Golden Globes (Portugal)

- Best Director

Venice Film Festival

- Filmcritica "Bastone Bianco" Award

== See also ==
- Cinema of Portugal
