= Leonor Baldaque =

Portuguese actress

- Born: January 27, 1977 (age 49); Porto, Portugal
- Occupation: Actress
- Years active: 1998-presents

Leonor Baldaque was born in Porto on 27 January 1977. She settled in Paris over twenty years ago and has also lived in Italy.

She has starred in several of Manoel de Oliveira's films since she was 19, travelling many European Festivals. In 2003 she was named one of Europe's Shooting Stars by the European Film Promotion and received the Best Actress award from the GDA Foundation for her role in ‘A Religiosa Portuguesa’, by film-maker Eugène Green, in 2009 .

As a writer, she writes in French and published her debut novel Vita (La Vie Légère) in January 2012 with Gallimard. In 2020, she published her second novel "Piero Solitude" with Verdier . In April 2024, Quetzal published a translation of his novel "Piero Solitude" .

She gave a concert to present her first album of original songs at Casa da Música in Porto in March 2024 . In April 2024, she released her first album of original songs in English, ‘A Few Dates of Love’ . She played a concert in Lisbon to present the album at the Auditorium of the Liceu Camões . To date, four singles have been released: Few Dates of Love, It's the Wind, My New drink, This is Where and Archetype of Love. The music videos were made by her .

She is the granddaughter of writer Agustina Bessa-Luís.

== Filmography ==
- 2009 The Portuguese Nun - Julie de Hauranne
- 2007 The Enigma Christopher Columbus - Sílvia (1957–60)
- 2006 Belle toujours - Jovem Prostituta
- 2005 A Conquista de Faro (short) - Claudina/Donna Brites
- 2005 Magic Mirror - Vicenta/Abril
- 2005 Maquette (short) - Leonor
- 2004 The Fifth Empire - Choir (voice)
- 2002 The Uncertainty Principle - Camila
- 2001 Porto of My Childhood - Ela
- 2001 Le Temps (short) - voice
- 2001 I'm Going Home - Sylvia
- 2000 Supercolla (short) - Sinderella
- 1998 Anxiety - Fisalina
