= Pedro Abrunhosa =

Portuguese singer, musician and songwriter

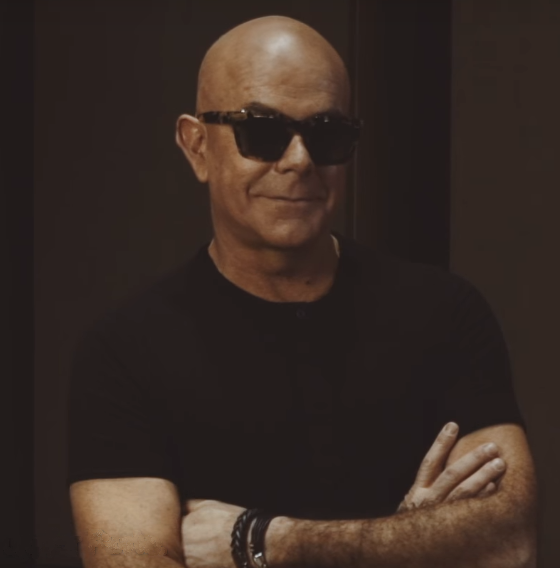
- Pedro Abrunhosa in 2017

Background information
- Born: Pedro Machado Abrunhosa; 20 December 1960 (age 65); Porto, Portugal
- Genres: Pop; jazz; funk; Rhythm and blues; rock
- Instruments: Vocals, piano
- Years active: 1985–present
- Labels: PolyGram; Universal Music
- Website: www.abrunhosa.com

Pedro Machado Abrunhosa (born 20 December 1960) is a Portuguese singer, songwriter, musician and composer. Trained in jazz music, Abrunhosa started his career in the 1980s playing in jazz bands and teaching in music and art schools in Porto. He is a co-founder of the Jazz School of Porto.

In 1994 Abrunhosa launched a solo career in pop music with his debut album Viagens. This album made Abrunhosa the fastest-selling artist in Portuguese record-industry history at the time, reaching number-one in the Portuguese album charts and selling over 140,000 copies. His second album Tempo (1996) carried on this success and confirmed Abrunhosa's status as a major artist in the Portuguese music industry. Six of his eight studio albums have reached number-one in the Portuguese album charts.

Aside from his music, he is known for always wearing sunglasses in public. Abrunhosa also played himself in the 1999 Manoel de Oliveira film The Letter. He is a board member of the Portuguese Authors Society.

== Early life ==
Abrunhosa was born in Porto, Portugal. After studying at the Ruvina Music School, he began his musical studies at the Music School of Porto in 1972, under the guidance of Professors Álvaro Salazar and Jorge Peixinho, in the subjects of Analysis, Composition, and History of Music, having already initiated his studies in the double bass. (He has often been approached by the Calouste Gulbenkian Foundation to attend and participate in the Meetings of Contemporary Music in that same institution.)

Once admitted into the "Conservatório de Música do Porto", he studied musical composition under the direction of Professor Cândido Lima. At that time, he was invited to take part in the Madrid Contemporary Music Group, under the direction of Spanish composer Enrique X. Macias. This afforded him the opportunity to take part in a series of shows performed in Portugal and Spain. In 1981, he received a diploma for the Courses of Musical Pedagogy from Belgian Professor Jos Wuytack.

== Career ==
=== 1984–1994: Early career ===
In 1984, he went to Madrid to study with double-bass player Todd Coolman and with musicians Joe Hunt, Wallace Rooney, Gerry Niewood and Steve Brown. In that same year, he finished the General Course of Composition in the "Conservatório de Música do Porto" and started studying double-bass with Alejandro Erlich Oliva.

In 1985, returning to Spain, he took part in the International Jazz Seminar, and worked again with Todd Coolman, Billy Hart, Bill Dobbins, David Schnitter, Jack Walrath and Steve Brown. In that same year, together with Spanish guitar player Joaquin Iglesias, he founded the quartet "Banda de Bolso".

In 1986, he returned to Spain to participate in the third International Jazz Seminar in Seville where he played with Bob Moses, Chip Jackson, Brad Hartfield, Hoku Kim and Stan Strickland. In Portugal, later that year, he participated in the Seminars of Direction and Interpretation of the Big band. He was chosen as the double-bass player of the newly formed orchestra. He also participated in two other Jazz Seminars with Danish saxophonist John Tchicai and bassist Peter Danstrup and the American musicians Paul Motian, Bill Frisell, and Joe Lovano.

In 1987, he worked with Dave Liebman, Billy Hart, Ron McClure and Richie Beirach in Barcelona. For one year, he taught double-bass at the Jazz School of Hot-Club in Lisbon. He also directed and produced the program "Até Jazz" in the "Rádio Clube do Porto". Later on, he joined Boulou Ferré, Ramon Cardo, Frankie Rose, Vicent Penasse and Tommy Halferty and extensively toured Portugal and throughout Europe. Additionally, he joined the Teacher's Quartet of Hot-Club of Portugal and Carlos Martin's Quartet.

He composed and recorded the music for the films "Amour en Latin", directed by Serge Abramovic, "Adão e Eva" directed by Joaquim Leitão, and "Novo Mundo". He was awarded Best Soundtrack at the Madrid Film Festival for the latter. He also composed the music for the theatrical pieces "Possessos de Amor", "A Teia", and "O Aniversário da Infanta" (Oscar Wilde). He composed the soundtrack to the video "150 Anos do Bonfim".

He co-founded the Jazz School of Porto, where he taught Harmony, Auditive Training and Group Music, during three years. He assembled and has conducted the orchestra of the Jazz School of Porto, concomitantly, composing most of its arrangements.

He was a teacher at the Higher Arts School of Porto (Cine-Video area), where lectured on the Formation and Analysis of the Soundtrack and at the Caius Music School on Group Music and Musical Production.

He formed and directed the Cool Jazz Orchestra, a musical group essentially devoted to Rhythm and blues. After three years of intense work it became "Pedro Abrunhosa e a Máquina do Som", performing original pieces, all of which were composed by Pedro Abrunhosa.

=== 1994–1995: Viagens and mainstream success ===
In 1994, Abrunhosa recorded his debut studio album Viagens with his new band Bandemónio, that included several of his former students. Released by PolyGram, Viagens had the participation of Maceo Parker - the sax player that usually accompanied James Brown. The album was a success, achieving triple platinum with the sale of 140,000 copies in Portugal.

With Viagens, Abrunhosa became "the fastest-selling artist in Portuguese record-industry history"; between October 1994 and January 1995, he performed in over 120 concerts across Portugal, with the estimated total audience surpassing 200,000. The tracks "Não Posso Mais" and "Socorro" were hits at dance clubs in the country, and Billboard considered Abrunhosa's sudden popularity a "music revolution" in a country where "music with jazzy foundations" was met with some reluctance. He was named best act in 1994 by major publications such as Blitz, Público and Diário de Notícias and in 2009 Viagens was considered by Blitz as the best Portuguese album of the 90s.

Under the band name "Pedro Abrunhosa e os Bandemónio", the album F was released. A book illustrating the adventures and trips of the group was also released. The book enjoyed the collaboration of two prestigious individuals in the literary and photographic worlds, respectively: Nuno Galopim and Kenton Thatcher.

In 1995, Abrunhosa was heavily involved in the protests against the sale of one of the most emblematic concert venues in Portugal, Coliseu do Porto, to the Universal Church of the Kingdom of God. The musician chained himself to the building, using his significant popularity to bring public awareness to the eminent sale, that would not be completed.

=== 1996–1998: Tempo ===
In September 1996, Abrunhosa went to Memphis and Minneapolis where he finished the final phase of mixing and mastering of his second album Tempo. The album was recorded in Porto, Lisbon, Memphis, and Minneapolis. The final mixing process, as well as a substantial portion of the rhythm and voice recording were supervised by Tom Tucker, technical director of Paisley Park and chief engineer on Prince's latest albums.

Supported by his label – PolyGram – he invited The New Power Generation Horns to collaborate on this album, formed by Kathy Jensen, Kenni Holmen, Michael Nelson, David Jensen, Steve Strand, Ricky Peterson and Paul Peterson (these last two being Prince's keyboard player and bassist). He also collaborated with Ozzie Melendez (Tower of Power), Carlos do Carmo, Opus Ensemble, and Rui Veloso. Tempo (Time), was launched at midnight on November 11, 1996. After its first week on the shelves, the album went double platinum with more than 200,000 copies sold in Portugal.

He started his new tour "Tempo Tour 97/98", with concerts across Portugal, as well as in France, Canada, Switzerland, Brazil, and the United States. In order to further the internationalization of his work, he went to Madrid, Paris, and London to record some of Tempo tracks in Spanish, French, and English.

In May of that same year, he returned to London, to film the video "No Way", with the collaboration of Tony Vanden Ende.

He composed the music and authored the script for the musical "O Rapaz de Papel" ("The Paper Boy"), presented to the public in March 1998, integrated into "O Festival dos Cem Dias" (The Hundred Day Festival") and preceding the opening of Expo '98.

He produced the solo debut album by vocalist Diana Basto, Amanhecer (Dawn), released by PolyGram. He was responsible for the lyrics and music. It was recorded together with Tom Tucker, and was mixed and mastered in Minneapolis and Los Angeles.

He was invited by Caetano Veloso to integrate his show in Expo '98 that has, so far, broken all the booking-office records.

Invited by Expo 98, he performed his show at the Sony Plaza in September. It was the only performance from Portugal's Expo 98 which was broadcast all over the world.

He was later invited to participate in the Manuel de Oliveira film, La Lettre (The Letter), together with Chiara Mastroianni and Françoise Fabian, where he played the leading role. The film was awarded the Prix du Jury in the 1999 Cannes Film Festival.

He produced his third album of originals Silence, finished in November 1999, which includes the presence of Caetano Veloso's percussionists, Nina Miranda (of Smoke City) and the strings section usually used by Radiohead and dEUS.

He won four Blitz Awards: Record of the Year, Artist of the Year, Best Song, and Best Group. A Bordalo, an award given by the press; a Globo de Ouro ("Golden Globe") awarded for the song “Se Eu Fosse Um Dia O Teu Olhar”; and five Nova Era Radio awards, given by radio stations and institutions.

=== 1999–present ===
In 1999, he gave a number of lectures throughout Portugal, mostly in libraries, schools, and universities, on topics related to artistic production and creation, literature, music and cinema. Some of lectures were published.

In 2002, he performed two shows at the Cultural Center of Belém, after a one-year hiatus. “Intimidade” was received favorably by the critics and public alike. The show, backed by IPAE, toured Portugal and proved to be an artistic and box-office success.

His album Momento (2002) was written and composed solely by him. It has the participation of the Helicon String Quartet. Manoel de Oliveira, the famous Portuguese director, directed the short film "Momento", as a video for the first single and title track off the album.

In Portugal, Momento reached double platinum, and was the most played album on radio. Pedro Abrunhosa released the album in Brazil through Universal, with the participation of local artists such as Zélia Duncan, Lenine, Sandra de Sá, and Adriana Calcanhoto. (His songs are performed in Brazil by a number of artists such as Elba Ramalho, Zeca Baleiro, Sandra Sá, and Rio Soul or Syang, among others.)

His first DVD, Intimidade went double platinum in just 2 weeks.

He is a standing board member of the Portuguese Authors Society.

== Artistry ==
=== Public persona ===
Abrunhosa is known for always wearing sunglasses in public. He was an influential personality in Portugal during the 90s, with a "strong image" and a "coherent and articulate speech".

== Discography ==
- Viagens (1994)
- Tempo (1996)
- Silêncio (1999)
- Momento (2002)
- Luz (2007)
- Longe (2010)
- Contramão (2013)
- Espiritual (2018)
- Inverbo (2026)

== See also ==
- Music of Portugal
