= Ruy de Carvalho =

Portuguese actor (born 1927)

Ruy de Carvalho GCSE GCIH GCM
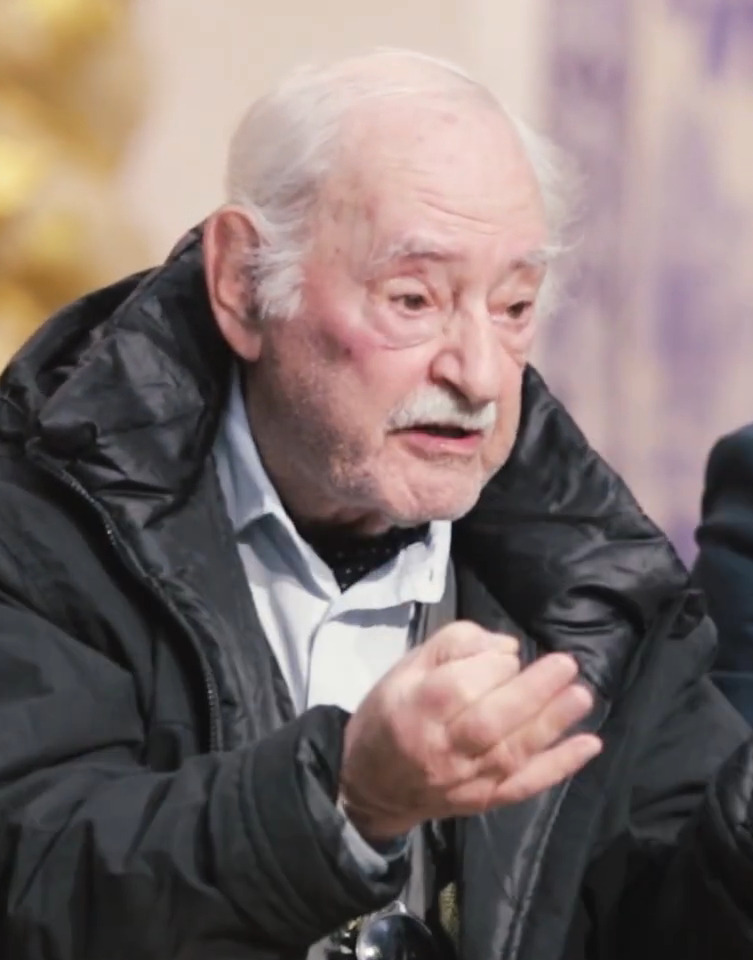
- Carvalho in 2025
- Born: 1 March 1927 (age 99); Lisbon, Portugal
- Occupation: Actor
- Years active: 1952–present

Ruy Alberto Rebelo Pires de Carvalho (born 1 March 1927) is a Portuguese actor. As of 2026, he is the world's oldest actor still working in theatre.

== Selected filmography ==
Film
Year	Title	Role	Notes
1990	No, or the Vain Glory of Command		
1993	Abraham's Valley		
1994	A Caixa		
2000	April Captains		

TV
Year	Title	Role	Notes
2009-2014	Enchanted	Elder Ruy	57 Episodes
2014	Embraced	Elder Ruy	3 Episodes
2012	Louco Amor		
