= Gebo and the Shadow =

- Directed by: Manoel de Oliveira
- Written by: Manoel de Oliveira; Raul Brandão (play)
- Produced by: Antoine de Clermont-Tonnerre; Martine de Clermont-Tonnerre; Luís Urbano
- Starring: Michael Lonsdale; Jeanne Moreau; Claudia Cardinale; Ricardo Trêpa; Leonor Silveira
- Cinematography: Renato Berta
- Edited by: Valérie Loiseleux
- Release dates: 5 September 2012 (Venice); 27 September 2012 (Portugal)
- Running time: 90 minutes
- Countries: Portugal; France; Brazil
- Language: French
- Budget: €1.6 million

Gebo and the Shadow (Portuguese: O Gebo e a Sombra, French: Gebo et l'Ombre) is a 2012 Portuguese-French drama film directed by Manoel de Oliveira. It is based on a play by Raul Brandão. It was shown at the 69th Venice International Film Festival. The film received a 100% rating on Rotten Tomatoes.

It was the final feature film directed by de Oliveira, who was 104 years of age when the film was released, and one of the last film appearances of Jeanne Moreau before her death on 31 July 2017.

== Cast ==
- Claudia Cardinale as Doroteia
- Jeanne Moreau as Candidinha
- Michael Lonsdale as Gebo
- Leonor Silveira as Sofia
- Ricardo Trêpa as João
- Luís Miguel Cintra as Chamiço

== Music ==
Much of the music on the soundtrack consists of excerpts of a 2004 recording of the Violin Concerto in D minor, Op. 47 of Jean Sibelius.
