= I'm Going Home (film) =

2001 film by Manoel de Oliveira

- Directed by: Manoel de Oliveira
- Written by: Manoel de Oliveira
- Produced by: Paulo Branco
- Starring: Michel Piccoli; Catherine Deneuve; John Malkovich
- Release date: 13 May 2001 (Cannes)
- Running time: 90 minutes
- Countries: France; Portugal
- Languages: French; English
- Box office: $853,000

I'm Going Home (French: Je rentre à la maison, Portuguese: Vou Para Casa) is a 2001 film written and directed by Manoel de Oliveira. It premieres in 2001 Cannes Film Festival in the main competition.

== Plot ==
The film opens in a theater where Eugène Ionesco's Exit the King is staged. Gilbert Valence, playing the King on stage, is a distinguished actor of theater. In his dressing room he receives the shocking news that his wife, daughter, and son-in-law have been killed in a car accident, and he must bring up their little boy on his own. As time passes, Valence is apparently over his grief. He busies himself with his daily life in Paris and, with help from his housekeeper, looks after his 9-year-old grandson Serge. We see that he plays Prospero in a French language version of William Shakespeare's The Tempest. As a grand old man of the theater, he turns down well-paying roles in low-brow television productions. However, when an American filmmaker John Crawford urgently needs an actor to play young Irishman Buck Mulligan, in a film adaptation of James Joyce's Ulysses to be shot in Paris (in English) in three days, he was pushed into accepting the role. The result of this obvious miscasting becomes apparent during the shoot, and Vance, sensing the language barrier, his ill-preparation and old age, finds himself saying "Je rentre à la maison" and leaving the film set.

== Cast ==
- Michel Piccoli as Gilbert Valence
- Catherine Deneuve as Marguerite
- John Malkovich as John Crawford, Film Director
- Antoine Chappey as George
- Leonor Baldaque as Sylvia
- Leonor Silveira as Marie
- Ricardo Trêpa as Guard
- Jean-Michel Arnold - Doctor
- Adrien de Van as Ferdinand
- Sylvie Testud as Ariel
- Isabel Ruth as Milkmaid
- Andrew Wale as Stephen
- Robert Dauney as Haines
- Jean Koeltgen as Serge
- Mauricette Gourdon as Guilhermine, the Housekeeper

== Reception ==
On review aggregator website Rotten Tomatoes, the film has a 96% approval rating based on 55 reviews, with an average rating of 7.78/10 and the consensus that it is "a masterfully subtle and poignant exploration of mortality." It was one of the films in competition for the Palme d'Or in the 2001 Cannes Film Festival. It won the Critics Award for Best Film at the 2001 São Paulo International Film Festival and the Golden Anchor Award at the 2002 Haifa International Film Festival. It also won the Globo de Ouro for Best Film at the 2002 Globos de Ouro. Michel Piccoli was nominated for Best Actor at the 2001 European Film Awards.

Anthony Quinn of The Independent wrote, "Always good to see Michel Piccoli...in Manoel de Oliveira's I'm Going Home he plays Valence, a grand old stage actor who has recently lost his family...Few cameras stare so intently at things as de Oliveira's, and the long excerpts he films from Ionesco and The Tempest are frankly de trop, but this patient detailing of an actor's life...has a fascination akin to watching a sun slowly disappear beneath the horizon."
