= The Cannibals (1988 film) =

1988 film

- Film poster
- Directed by: Manoel de Oliveira
- Written by: Álvaro Carvalhal; Manoel de Oliveira; João Paes
- Produced by: Paulo Branco; Paulo De Sousa
- Starring: Luís Miguel Cintra; Leonor Silveira; Diogo Dória
- Cinematography: Mário Barroso
- Edited by: Manoel de Oliveira; Sabine Franel
- Music by: João Paes
- Release date: 10 November 1988
- Running time: 98 minutes
- Country: Portugal
- Language: Portuguese

The Cannibals (Portuguese: Os Canibais) is a 1988 Portuguese drama film directed by Manoel de Oliveira. It was entered into the 1988 Cannes Film Festival. The film was selected as the Portuguese entry for the Best Foreign Language Film at the 62nd Academy Awards, but was not accepted as a nominee.

== Cast ==
- Luís Miguel Cintra as Viscount d'Aveleda
- Leonor Silveira as Margarida
- Diogo Dória as Don João
- Oliveira Lopes as The Presenter (Iago)
- Pedro T. da Silva as Niccolo
- Joel Costa as Urbano Solar, Margarida's father
- Rogério Samora as Peralta
- Rogério Vieira as The Magistrate
- António Loja Neves as The Baron
- Luís Madureira
- Teresa Côrte-Real
- José Manuel Mendes
- Cândido Ferreira
- Glória de Matos (as Glória Matos)

== See also ==
- List of submissions to the 62nd Academy Awards for Best Foreign Language Film
- List of Portuguese submissions for the Academy Award for Best Foreign Language Film
