= Porto of My Childhood =

2001 film by Manoel de Oliveira

- Directed by: Manoel de Oliveira
- Written by: Manoel de Oliveira
- Produced by: Paulo Branco
- Starring: Manoel de Oliveira; Jorge Trepa; Ricardo Trêpa; Maria de Medeiros; José Wallenstein
- Cinematography: Emmanuel Machuel
- Edited by: Valérie Loiseleux
- Release date: 2001
- Running time: 62 min
- Country: France/Portugal/Belgium
- Language: Portuguese

Porto of My Childhood (Portuguese: Porto da Minha Infância) is a 2001 Portuguese/French film directed by Manoel de Oliveira. Manoel de Oliveira narrates a documentary which features staged dramatic scenes of memories and stories told to him during his childhood in Porto.

== Cast ==
- Jorge Trêpa - Manoel 1
- Ricardo Trêpa - Manoel 2
- Maria de Medeiros - Miss Diabo
- Manoel de Oliveira - Himself / narrator / The Thief
- José Wallenstein - Joel
- Rogério Samora - Chico
- Nelson Freitas - Diogo
- Jorge Loureiro - Casais Monteiro
- António Costa - Rodrigues de Freitas
- José Maria Vaz da Silva - António Silva
- David Cardoso - Augusto Nobre
- Leonor Baldaque - Ela
- Leonor Silveira - Vamp
- António Fonseca - Rufia
- Nuno Sousa - Reis' assistant
- Agustina Bessa-Luís - Dama texto
- João Bénard da Costa - A man (as Duarte de Almeida)
- Estela Cunha - Mãe
