= Figueira Cid =

Portuguese actor and filmmaker

- Born: Figueira Cid; June 18, 1957 (age 69); Lisbon, Portugal
- Occupations: Actor, theatre director
- Years active: 1976–present

Figueira Cid (born 18 June 1957), is a Portuguese actor and theatre director. He has acted in both European and African films across three decades of cinema career. He is most notable for the roles in the films, Ministério do Tempo, Até Amanhã, Camaradas and The masked avenger: Lagardère.

== Personal life ==
He was born on 18 January 1957 in Lisbon, Portugal.

== Filmography ==
Year	Film	Role	Genre	Ref.
1983	Mãe Genovena		Film	
1984	Azul, Azul	Poeiro	Film	
1985	Vertiges	Un machiniste	Film	
1990	1871	Theatre Company Member	Film	
1991	O Clube dos Antropófagos		TV movie	
1991	O Natal do Pai Natal	Pinóquio	TV movie	
1992	Uma Outra Ordem	GNR Soldier	TV movie	
1992	Os Contos do Mocho Sábio	Pinóquio	TV series	
1994	I morgon, Mario	Guard	Film	
1994	A Visita da Velha Senhora	Son	TV movie	
1995	Adão e Eva	Postman	Stage	
1995	Aquela Cativa Que Me Tem Cativo	Gil Peres	TV mini-series	
1998	Fintar o Destino	Joaquim	Film	
2000	A Raia dos Medos	Dipuo	TV series	
2000	Lourdes	Dipuo	Film	
2000	Alta Fidelidade	Matias	TV movie	
2001	Cavaleiros De Água Doce	Armando	TV movie	
2001	A Febre do Ouro Negro	Justino	TV mini-series	
2003	O Meu Sósia E Eu	Officer Taborda	TV movie	
2003	Lusitana Paixão	Empresário	TV series	
2003	The masked avenger: Lagardère	Pelerin	TV series	
2004	A Ferreirinha	Father Abel	TV series	
2005	Carolina, Fernando e Eu	Pinto	TV movie	
2005	Mistura Fina	Florêncio Simões	TV series	
2005	Inspector Max		TV series	
2005	Até Amanhã, Camaradas	Jerónimo	TV mini-series	
2006	Floribella		TV series	
2006	Quando os Lobos Uivam		Film	
2006	Pobre de Pedir	Ricardo	Film	
2008	O Dia do Regicídio	Doutor	TV mini-series	
2008	Liberdade 21	Barman	TV series	
2008	Do Outro Lado do Mundo	Mechanic	Film	
2009	Conexão	Guarda Porto	TV mini-series	
2009	O Último Condenado à Morte	Alfaiate	Film	
2010	Cidade Despida		TV series	
2010	Morangos com Açúcar	Felício	TV series	
2010	O Segredo de Miguel Zuzarte	Mourão	TV movie	
2011	Conta-me Como Foi	Renato	TV series	
2011	My Name Is Bernadette	Troy	Film	
2012	Remédio Santo	Jerónimo	TV series	
2012	Louco Amor	Júlio's Father	TV series	
2012	Imagine	Pai de Célia	TV series	
2012	Vida Tramada		Short film	
2013	Dancin' Days		TV series	
2013	Belmonte		TV series	
2013	Sol de Inverno	Pai de Célia	TV series	
2014	Bem-Vindos a Beirais	Óscar	TV series	
2015	Mar Salgado		TV series	
2015	Catleia	Professor Artur	Short film	
2015	Jardins Proibidos	Cajó	TV series	
2016	Coração d'Ouro	Amilcar	TV series	
2016	Rainha das Flores	Isaías Neto	TV series	
2016	A Impostora	Gomes	TV series	
2016	A Única Mulher	Pai de Rui	TV series	
2017	Mata Hari	Priest	TV series	
2017	Ouro Verde	Médico	TV series	
2017	Inspector Max	Pedro Torres	TV series	
2017	Ministério do Tempo	Antão Telles de Menezes	TV series	
2017	Filha da Lei	Roberto Oliveira	TV series	
2017	Jacinta	Januário	Film	
2017	Espelho d'Água	Oncologista	TV series	
2018	Aparição	Bailote	Film	
2019	Golpe de Sorte	Helder	TV series	
2019	Variações: Guardian Angel	Dipuo	Film	
2020	Nazaré	Pedre	TV series	
2020	Fatima	Doctor Ramires	Film	
2020	Terra Nova	Francisco	TV series	
2020	Bem Bom		Film	
