= Miguel Guilherme =

Portuguese actor (born 1958)

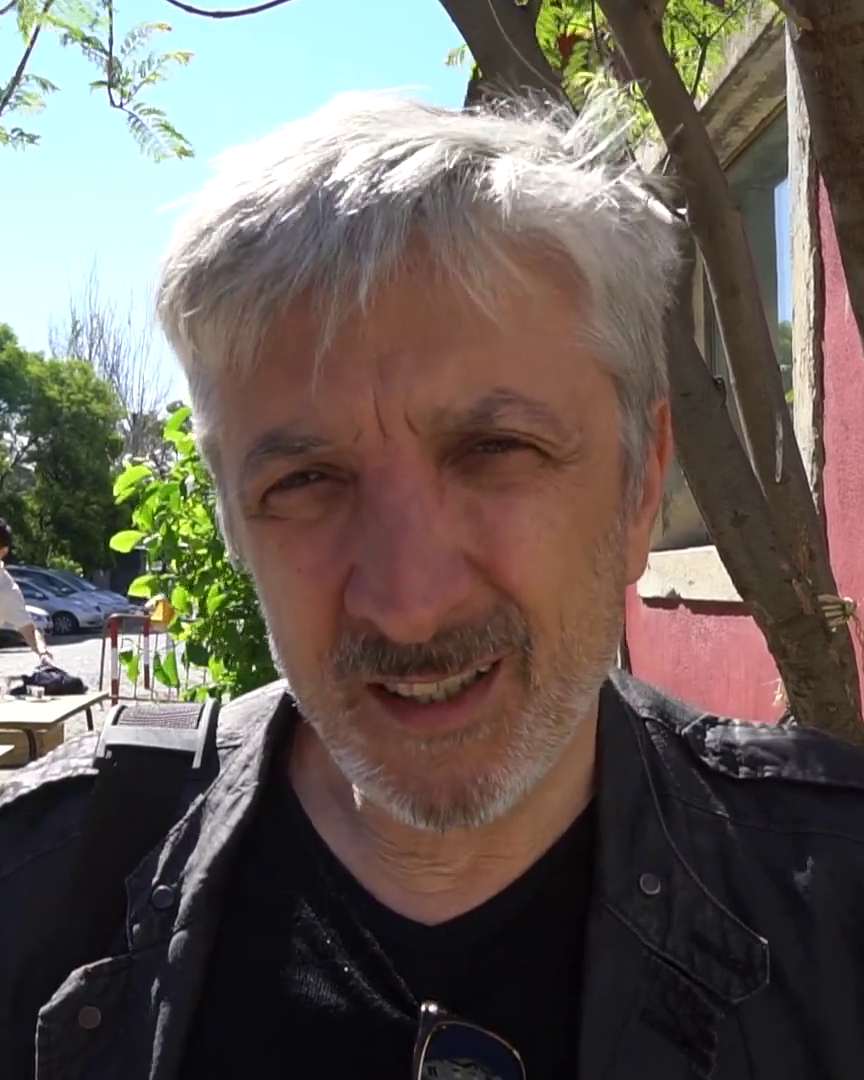
- Image of Portuguese actor and director Miguel Guilherme, 2018
- Born: 15 November 1958 (age 67); Lisbon, Portugal
- Occupation: Actor
- Years active: 1980–present

Miguel Guilherme (born 15 November 1958) is a Portuguese actor. He has appeared in more than seventy films since 1980.

== Selected filmography ==
Film and television
Year	Title	Role	Notes
2023	Cavalos de Corrida	Orlando	
2022-	Quero é Viver		
2021	Princípio, Meio e Fim	Velho Lobo do Mar	
2021	Na Porta ao Lado: Esperança	Mário	
2020	The Last Bath	Padre Manuel	
2018	Parque Mayer	José	
2015-2016	Coração d'Ouro	Luís Noronha	
2015	The Portuguese Falcon	General Gaivota	
2009	Eccentricities of a Blonde-haired Girl	Faleiro	
2007-2023	Conta-me Como Foi	António Lopes	
2005	Alice		
2004	The Fifth Empire		
2002	Aparelho Voador a Baixa Altitude		
2000	Word and Utopia		
1999-2001	O Fura-Vidas	Quim Fintas	
1996	Foreign Land		
1993	The House of the Spirits		
1991	The Divine Comedy		
1990	No, or the Vain Glory of Command		
