= A Talking Picture =

2003 film by Manoel de Oliveira

- Film poster
- Portuguese: Um Filme Falado
- Directed by: Manoel de Oliveira
- Written by: Manoel de Oliveira
- Produced by: Paulo Branco
- Starring: Leonor Silveira; Catherine Deneuve; Irene Papas; Stefania Sandrelli; John Malkovich
- Cinematography: Emmanuel Machuel
- Release date: 2003
- Running time: 96 minutes
- Country: Portugal
- Languages: Portuguese; French; Greek; English; Italian
- Box office: $20,237

A Talking Picture (Portuguese: Um Filme Falado) is a 2003 Portuguese drama film written and directed by Manoel de Oliveira and starring Catherine Deneuve, John Malkovich, Irene Papas, Stefania Sandrelli and Leonor Silveira. This was Irene Papas’ final film before her death in 2022.

== Plot ==
In July 2001, Rosa Maria, a university teacher, takes her little daughter Maria Joana on a cruise from their home country of Portugal to Bombay, India, to see Rosa's husband who is an airplane pilot. Her motive is to visit the birthplaces of civilization. At each port, a new person boards the ship. A famous businesswoman boards in France, a famous model in Italy, and a famous actress in Athens. The captain of the ship invites the three distinguished women to dinner at his table, and they all speak in their own languages for the better part of the conversation. Later in the movie, Maria Joana and Rosa Maria are also invited to his table, where the captain presents the child with a gift.

At dinner that night, the captain is informed that in Aden terrorists have planted two time bombs aboard the ship. The passengers are then ordered to evacuate. Maria Joana runs back to her and her mother's cabin to get the Arab doll the captain presented her with earlier that evening. Rosa Maria realizes that Maria Joana is missing, runs to the cabin to find her, and takes her back on deck to board a life raft. Unfortunately, it is too late; all the life rafts have left.

The captain sees them on deck and yells for them to jump. As he is struggling to take off his uniform so he can swim to rescue them, there is the sound of two explosions and a bright light lights up the captain's face. The credits are displayed with the face of the distraught captain, lit up from the explosion, in the background.

== Cast ==
- Leonor Silveira as Rosa Maria
- John Malkovich as Captain John Walesa
- Stefania Sandrelli as Francesca
- Catherine Deneuve as Delfina
- Irene Papas as Helena
- Filipa de Almeida as Maria Joana
- Nikos Hatzopoulos as Father Ortodox
- Luís Miguel Cintra as self
- Michel Lubrano di Sbaraglione as fisherman
- François Da Silva as fisherman's client
- Antònio Ferraiolo as Cicerone Pompeia
- Ricardo Trêpa as Cicerone at the Museum of Santa Sophia
- David Cardoso as official
- Júlia Buisel as Delfina's friend

== Reception ==
On review aggregator website Rotten Tomatoes, the film has an approval rating of 76% based on 25 critics, with an average rating of 6.6/10. The site's critics' consensus states "A Talking Picture occasionally struggles to engagingly convey its ambitious themes, but viewers attuned to its distinctive frequencies will find it well worth a watch".

Critics were generally positive. Walter V. Addiego of the San Francisco Chronicle called the film "A potent and troubling meditation on the state of Western society". Writing for the Los Angeles Times, Kevin Thomas said that "Oliveira establishes a sense of timelessness only to catch his audience up short with a film that ultimately could scarcely be a more timely comment on the world in which we live". And in a review for Variety, Deborah Young said that the film was "A film destined to divide Manoel de Oliveira's fans but also to win him new ones".

According to Manohla Dargis of The New York Times, "The Portuguese director Manoel de Oliveira again shows himself to be a master of the medium with this sharply cut gem of a film about a mother and daughter sailing the Mediterranean".
