= Voyage to the Beginning of the World =

1997 film

- Directed by: Manoel de Oliveira
- Written by: Jacques Parsi; Manoel de Oliveira
- Produced by: Paulo Branco
- Starring: Marcello Mastroianni
- Cinematography: Renato Berta
- Edited by: Valérie Loiseleux
- Release date: 5 May 1997
- Running time: 95 minutes
- Countries: France; Portugal
- Languages: French; Portuguese

Voyage to the Beginning of the World (Portuguese: Viagem ao Princípio do Mundo, French: Voyage au début du monde) is a 1997 Portuguese-French drama film directed by Manoel de Oliveira and starring Marcello Mastroianni. The film was selected as the Portuguese entry for the Best Foreign Language Film at the 70th Academy Awards, but was not accepted as a nominee. It was Mastroianni's final film.

== Plot ==
French actor Afonso visits the Portuguese village where his father once left. He is accompanied by the film director Manoel who hereby returns to the places of his childhood. Together with two other actors who serve as translators they make it to the remote village and meet Afonso's estranged kin.

== Cast ==
- Marcello Mastroianni as Manoel
- Jean-Yves Gautier as Afonso
- Leonor Silveira as Judite
- Diogo Dória as Duarte
- Isabel de Castro as Maria Afonso
- Cécile Sanz de Alba as Christina
- José Pinto as José Afonso
- Adelaide Teixeira as Woman
- Isabel Ruth as Olga
- Manoel de Oliveira as Driver
- José Maria Vaz da Silva as Assistant
- Fernando Bento as Man 1
- Mário Moutinho as Man 2
- Jorge Mota as Man 3
- Sara Alves as Girl
- Helder Esteves as Boy

== Accolades ==
The film was screened out of competition at the 1997 Cannes Film Festival where it won the FIPRESCI Prize.

== See also ==
- List of submissions to the 70th Academy Awards for Best Foreign Language Film
- List of Portuguese submissions for the Academy Award for Best Foreign Language Film
