= The Uncertainty Principle (film) =

2002 film

- Directed by: Manoel de Oliveira
- Written by: Agustina Bessa-Luís; Manoel de Oliveira
- Produced by: Paulo Branco
- Starring: Leonor Baldaque
- Cinematography: Renato Berta
- Edited by: Manoel de Oliveira; Catherine Krassovsky
- Release date: 17 May 2002
- Running time: 133 minutes
- Country: Portugal
- Language: Portuguese

The Uncertainty Principle (Portuguese: O Princípio da Incerteza) is a 2002 Portuguese drama film directed by Manoel de Oliveira. It was entered into the 2002 Cannes Film Festival.

== Cast ==
- Leonor Baldaque - Camila
- Leonor Silveira - Vanessa
- Isabel Ruth - Celsa
- Ricardo Trêpa - Jose Feliciano
- Ivo Canelas - Antonio Clara
- Luís Miguel Cintra - Daniel Roper
- José Manuel Mendes - Torcato Roper
- Carmen Santos - Joana
- Cecília Guimarães - Rute
- Júlia Buisel - Aunt Tofi
- Ângela Marques - Adoração
- Diogo Dória - Policeman
- Antonio Fonseca - Policeman
- Duarte de Almeida - Mr. Ferreira
- P. João Marques - Priest
- António Costa - Tiago
- David Cardoso - Overman
