= The Divine Comedy (film) =

- Directed by: Manoel de Oliveira
- Written by: Manoel de Oliveira (partially based on) Fyodor Dostoevsky; José Régio; Friedrich Nietzsche
- Produced by: Paulo Branco
- Starring: Maria de Medeiros; Luís Miguel Cintra; Miguel Guilherme
- Cinematography: Ivan Kozelka
- Edited by: Valérie Loiseleux; Manoel de Oliveira
- Release date: 11 October 1991
- Running time: 140 minutes
- Countries: France; Portugal
- Language: Portuguese

The Divine Comedy (A Divina Comédia) is a 1991 Portuguese drama film directed by Manoel de Oliveira. It was screened in competition at the 48th Venice International Film Festival, in which it won the Special Jury Prize.

== Cast ==
- Maria de Medeiros as Sónia
- Miguel Guilherme as Raskolnikov
- Luís Miguel Cintra as Prophet
- Mário Viegas as Philosopher
- Leonor Silveira as Eva
- Diogo Dória as Ivan
- Paulo Matos as Jesus
