= The Letter (1999 film) =

- Directed by: Manoel de Oliveira
- Written by: Manoel de Oliveira
- Based on: The Princess of Cleves; 1678 novel by Madame de Lafayette
- Produced by: Paulo Branco
- Starring: Chiara Mastroianni; Pedro Abrunhosa; Leonor Silveira; Antoine Chappey
- Cinematography: Emmanuel Machuel
- Edited by: Valérie Loiseleux
- Release dates: 21 May 1999 (Cannes); 22 September 1999 (France)
- Running time: 107 minutes
- Countries: France; Portugal
- Languages: French; Portuguese
- Box office: $766,920

The Letter (French: La Lettre, Portuguese: A Carta) is a 1999 French-Portuguese drama film directed by Manoel de Oliveira. It tells the story of a married woman who has feelings for another man, and who confesses her feelings to her friend, a cloistered nun. The film is loosely based on the 1678 French novel The Princess of Cleves by Madame de Lafayette.

The film was entered into the 1999 Cannes Film Festival where it won the Jury Prize.

== Synopsis ==
The film opens in a Parisian jewelry store where a young and beautiful Mademoiselle Catherine de Chartres (Chiara Mastroianni), accompanied by her mother and Mme de Chartres's close friend Mme de Silva are present. By accident, an aristocrat, Jacques de Clèves, a famous and wealthy doctor, is also there, although no words are exchanged. Later all of them meet again at a Franz Schubert piano recital (D. 946) by Maria João Pires. While Dr. de Clèves falls immediately in love with Catherine, she doesn't feel a strong passion for him. Nevertheless, she eventually accepts the marriage proposal from him. After a brief honeymoon, the couple settle in Paris.

One night the couple attend a gala concert where Pedro Abrunhosa, the well-known Portuguese singer, performs. Catherine feels an instant strong attraction towards Pedro. However, this passion leaves her divided and embittered by a strong sense of guilt, especially because she does not have the same feeling towards her husband. Meanwhile, Catherine''s mother falls very ill, and, before she dies, tells Catherine that she is aware of her attraction to Pedro but advises her not to yield to the passion but to maintain her reputation. A nun (Leonor Silveira) who was a childhood friend of Catherine listens to her sorrows and doubts, and gives her advice and comfort. Nevertheless, her husband learns about it. Despite the fact that Catherine has done no wrong, he suffers and falls seriously ill, and dies.

Catherine feels a strong sense of guilt for her husband's death. She goes to her friend in the convent for advice and comfort. Her friend advises her to pursue her heart's love, but Catherine fears an uncertain future of passion and decides to avoid Pedro, who has now moved to an apartment across the street in the hope of meeting her. Eventually, we learn from a letter to her religious friend that Catherine has become a (secular) missionary in Africa.

== Cast ==
- Chiara Mastroianni as Mme de Clèves
- Pedro Abrunhosa as Pedro Abrunhosa
- Antoine Chappey as M. de Clèves
- Leonor Silveira as La religieuse
- Françoise Fabian as Mme de Chartres
- Maria João Pires as Maria João Pires
- Anny Romand as Mme de Silva
- Luís Miguel Cintra as M. Da Silva
- Stanislas Merhar as François de Guise
- Claude Lévèque as Mme de Chartres's doctor
- Ricardo Trêpa as Intrus
- Alain Guillo as manager of the jewelry shop
- Jean-Loup Wolff as the hospital doctor
- Marcel Terroux as the gardener

== Reception ==
The film won the Jury Prize in 1999 Cannes Film Festival and was named one of top 10 films of 1999 by Cahiers du Cinéma. Stephen Holden reviewed the movie in The New York Times.
