= Anxiety (1998 film) =

1998 film

- Directed by: Manoel de Oliveira
- Written by: Agustina Bessa-Luís; Manoel de Oliveira; Prista Monteiro; António Patrício
- Produced by: Paulo Branco
- Starring: Leonor Baldaque
- Cinematography: Renato Berta
- Edited by: Valérie Loiseleux
- Release date: 19 May 1998
- Running time: 110 minutes
- Country: Portugal
- Language: Portuguese

Anxiety (Portuguese: Inquietude) is a 1998 Portuguese drama film directed by Manoel de Oliveira. It was screened out of competition at the 1998 Cannes Film Festival. The film was selected as the Portuguese entry for the Best Foreign Language Film at the 71st Academy Awards, but was not accepted as a nominee.

== Cast ==
- Afonso Araújo - Boy
- Leonor Araújo - Girl
- Leonor Baldaque - Fisalina
- Fernando Bento - Fisalina's Father
- Rita Blanco - Gabi
- David Cardoso - Friend
- Luís Miguel Cintra - Son
- Diogo Dória - Him
- Alexandre Melo - Friend
- Joao Costa Menezes - Guest
- Clara Nogueira - Maid
- André Pacheco - Brother 2
- Irene Papas - Mother
- Marco Pereira - Brother 1
- José Pinto - Father
- António Reis - Count
- Isabel Ruth - Marta
- Leonor Silveira - Suzy
- Adelaide Teixeira - Stepmother
- Ricardo Trêpa - Boyfriend

== See also ==
- List of submissions to the 71st Academy Awards for Best Foreign Language Film
- List of Portuguese submissions for the Academy Award for Best Foreign Language Film
