= Hélder Prista Monteiro =

Hélder Prista Monteiro (Lisbon, 1922 - 1 November 1994) was a Portuguese playwright and writer. He is known as one of the major practitioners of the theatre of the absurd.
