= Louco Amor (Portuguese TV series) =

- Starring: Nicolau Breyner; Fernanda Serrano; Mafalda Luís de Castro
- Country of origin: Portugal
- Original language: Portuguese
- No. of episodes: 271

Original release
- Network: TVI
- Release: 6 May 2012 – 12 April 2013

Louco Amor is a Portuguese telenovela.

== Cast ==
Cast on the official website:

- Ruy de Carvalho as Óscar Ribeirinho
- Rodrigo Figueiredo as Tiago Morais
- Adriana Sá as Inês Morais
- Victor Emanuel as Pedro Morais
- Marta Fernandes as Joana Morais
- Patrícia Candoso as Beatriz Sousa (Bia)
- Martinho da Silva as Tomás Soeiro
- Bárbara Norton de Matos as Berta Abreu
- Pedro Górgia as Henrique Antunes (Riky)
- Rebeca Gonçalves as Marina Miranda
- Sofia Grillo as Gisela Miranda (Gi)
- Fernanda Serrano as Violeta Martins
- José Raposo as Egídio Onofre
- Isabel Medina as Custódia Veloz
- Simone de Oliveira as Carlota Caetano Menezes
- Sara Prata as Patrícia Rebelo Corvo
- Rita Salema as Marta Rebelo Corvo
- Tozé Martinho as Filipe Pimenta
- Nicolau Breyner as Carlos Correia
- Liliana Santos as Mafalda Mendes
- José Carlos Pereira as Duarte Mendes
- David Carreira as Francisco Correia (Chico)
- Lourenço Mimoso as Miguel Correia
- Helena Isabel as Graça Correia
- Suzana Borges as Leonor Correia
- Luís Esparteiro as Rafael Correia
- Elsa Galvão as Hermínia Veloz
- Diana Nicolau as Carla Veloz Alegria (Carlinha)
- Helder Agapito as Júlio Davin
- Márcia Breia as Lucinda Rocha
- Mafalda Luís de Castro as Margarida Rocha
