= The Strange Case of Angelica =

2010 Portuguese supernatural psychological romantic drama film by Manoel de Oliveira

- International promotional poster
- Portuguese: O Estranho Caso de Angélica
- Directed by: Manoel de Oliveira
- Written by: Manoel de Oliveira
- Produced by: François d'Artemare
- Starring: Ricardo Trêpa; Pilar López de Ayala; Leonor Silveira; Luís Miguel Cintra
- Cinematography: Sabine Lancelin
- Edited by: Valérie Loiseleux
- Music by: Maria João Pires
- Production companies: Filmes do Tejo; Eddie Saeta; Les Films de l'Après-Midi
- Distributed by: ZON Lusomundo (Portugal); Epicentre Films (France)
- Release dates: 13 May 2010 (Cannes); 16 March 2011 (France); 28 April 2011 (Portugal)
- Running time: 97 minutes
- Countries: Portugal; France; Spain
- Language: Portuguese

The Strange Case Of Angelica (Portuguese: O Estranho Caso De Angélica) is a 2010 Portuguese supernatural psychological romantic drama film written and directed by Manoel de Oliveira. Conceived in 1946 and initially written in 1952, it was updated with modern elements by the 2000s. It follows the Jewish photographer Isaac (Ricardo Trêpa), who after attending the funeral of Angélica (Pilar López de Ayala), a beautiful deceased young bride, begins to be haunted by her image.

The film had its world premiere at the Un Certain Regard section of the 2010 Cannes Film Festival on 13 May. It was theatrically released in Portugal on 6 March 2011.

It is considered one of Oliveira's best efforts, and was met with wide critical acclaim. It was filmed shortly after he turned 100 years old.

== Premise ==
In Portugal, in the year 2000, Isaac, a young Sefardic photographer rents an apartment in a modest pension of Senhora Justina, in Peso da Régua. On a rainy night, he is suddenly woken up to help a wealthy family with an extraordinary task: to take the last portrait of their daughter, Angélica, a young woman who died soon after her own wedding. Upon his arrival at Quinta das Portas, Isaac encounters a family in mourning for the young woman. In one of the chambers, the photographer discovers Angélica and is dazzled by her beauty. At the moment when the view through the lens becomes focused, Angélica seems to bring back to life especially for him. For a few seconds, she gives a wink and smiles.

The next day, the photographer returns to the activity that brought him to the Douro region and goes out to document the old methods of working in the vineyards, with special attention to the so-called «earth diggers». But Isaac cannot forget the image of Angelica and feels magically haunted by the young woman. He lives in pursuit of the enchanting power of the successive apparitions of Angélica's ghost, which leave him deeply in love. Gradually, the photographer becomes exhausted and more and more distances himself from the environment that surrounds him and from his life and social routine, until he ends up succumbing without apparent explanation.

== Cast ==
- Ricardo Trêpa as Isaac
- Pilar López de Ayala as Angélica
- Leonor Silveira as Angélica's Mother
- Luís Miguel Cintra as Engineer
- Filipe Vargas as Angélica's Husband
- Ana Maria Magalhães as Clementina
- Sara Carinhas as Nun Maria
- Susana Sá as Ms. Rosa
- Isabel Ruth as Angélica's family maid
- José Manuel Mendes as Dr. Matias
- Ricardo Aibéo as the homeless beggar
- Paulo Matos as Homem da Gabardine
- Adelaide Teixeira as Justina
- António Reis as Angélica's uncle

== Production ==
=== Development ===
During the long hiatus Oliveira entered after Aniki-Bóbó (1942), Maria Antónia, a cousin of his wife, died days after her wedding. The event inspired the initial idea, turned into a screenplay by 1952 entitled Angélica.

The narrative was originally conceived as a response to the World War II, as the character Isaac would be a Jewish Holocaust refugee photographer who had recently arrived in Portugal. The script featured discussions about the persecution of Jews in Portugal and the origins of antisemitism.

Angélica was one of Manoel de Oliveira's projects whose funding was repeatedly denied, forcing him into a 14-year hiatus until The Artist and the City (1956). Oliveira submitted the project to the Secretariado Nacional de Informação, the censorship body of the Salazar regime (Estado Novo). The filmmaker never received a response. He later considered that "A story like this had nothing to please the regime. It served them neither politically nor as a distraction for the people [...]. The plot must have seemed to them a veiled denunciation of a totalitarian government that clipped the wings of freedom".

In 1988, the Cinemateca Portuguesa (Lisbon) published "Some unrealized projects and other texts - Manoel de Oliveira", which includes the screenplay of Angélica, among others, such as Bruma (1931), Os Gigantes do Douro (1934), Prostituição (1940) and Saltimbancos (1944).

The screenplay was also published in France under the title "Angélica (1954): Un découpage" in 1993. An English language translation was published in 1998. In the preface to this edition, Oliveira describes how Maria Antónia's death inspired the narrative: "We received a phone call […] informing us that Maria Antónia had felt unwell. […] As they knew I always had a camera in the glove compartment of my car, they asked me to take a photograph, saying that the deceased looked very beautiful […] My camera was a pre-war Leica, whose focus was achieved through a viewfinder where the image unfolds and overlaps […]. This specific focusing exercise gave me the strange impression of seeing a soul leaving the body".

=== Pre-production ===
In the 21st century, French producer Leon Cakoff convinced Manoel de Oliveira to return to the project. He sought to adapt the argument with contemporary elements, adding possibilities that cinema could not allow it in the 1950s.

The film was a co-production between Portugal, France and Spain. It was produced by Filmes do Tejo II (Portugal), Eddie Saeta SA (Espanha), Les Films de l’Après-Midi (França), with the support of the São Paulo International Film Festival (Mostra SP). In partnership with Instituto do Cinema e Audiovisual (ICA), RTP, Centre national du cinéma et de l'image animée, Calouste Gulbenkian Foundation, Ibermedia Program, Institute of Cinematography and Audiovisual Arts (ICAA), Fundo Nacional da Cultura (FNC) and the Ministry of Culture (Brazil).

== Release ==
The Strange Case of Angelica was selected for the 2010 Cannes Film Festival, where it premiered as the opening of the Un Certain Regard section on 13 May. It was also selected for the 2010 Karlovy Vary Film Festival, the 2010 Toronto International Film Festival, 2010 New York Film Festival, 2010 São Paulo International Film Festival, among others.

It was theatrically released in France by Epicentre Films on 6 March 2011, and in Portugal by ZON Lusomundo on 28 April.

== Reception ==
=== Box office ===
Upon its premiere in France, the film attracted 32,674 viewers in theaters, and was the European country with more tickets sold. Spain followed with 6,019 viewers, and Portugal had a total of 2,724 viewers sold.

=== Critical response ===
Keith Uhlich of Time Out New York named The Strange Case of Angelica the sixth-best film of 2010, calling it "the greatest man-falls-in-love-with-a-ghost story ever directed by a 101-year-old."

In France, Cahiers du Cinéma listed it as the second-best film of 2011. Cahiers later named The Strange Case of Angelica the tenth-best film of the 2010s.
