= Isabel Ruth =

Portuguese actress

- Born: 6 April 1940 (age 86); Tomar, Portugal
- Occupation: Actress
- Years active: 1963–present

Isabel Ruth (born 6 April 1940) is a Portuguese actress. She has appeared in more than 50 films since 1963. She starred in River of Gold, which was screened in the Un Certain Regard section at the 1998 Cannes Film Festival.

== Selected filmography ==
- Os Verdes Anos (1963)
- Domingo À Tarde (1966)
- Mudar de Vida (1966)
- Agosto (1987)
- Hard Times (1988)
- Ossos (1997)
- Voyage to the Beginning of the World (1997)
- River of Gold (1998)
- The Mutants (1998)
- Anxiety (1998)
- Appassionate (1999)
- I'm Going Home (2001)
- The Uncertainty Principle (2002)
- Daqui P'rá Frente (2007)
- The Strange Case of Angelica (2010)
- Journey to Portugal (2011)
- Versailles (2013)
