= Party (1996 film) =

- Directed by: Manoel de Oliveira
- Written by: Jacques Parsi; Manoel de Oliveira; Agustina Bessa-Luís
- Produced by: Paulo Branco
- Starring: Michel Piccoli; Irene Papas
- Cinematography: Renato Berta
- Edited by: Valérie Loiseleux
- Release date: 5 October 1996
- Running time: 95 minutes
- Countries: France; Portugal
- Languages: French; Portuguese

Party is a 1996 Portuguese-French comedy-drama film directed by Manoel de Oliveira. It was screened in competition at the 1996 Venice Film Festival. It is Oliveira's fifth feature film.

== Plot summary ==
For their 10th wedding anniversary, Leonor and her husband Rogério are hosting a garden party in the elegant country house near Ponta Delgada in the Azores, which Rogério inherited from his wealthy family. When all the preparations have been made, Leonor suddenly decides to simply cancel the party. Rogério tells her that this is impossible.

Among the invited guests are two special friends, the well-known mature Greek actress Irene and her lover, the now also somewhat older bon vivant and seducer Michel.

Michel feels obliged to court the young, cheerful and attractive hostess, who seems to be playing along with him. His advances do not go unnoticed, neither by Leonor's husband Rogério nor by Michel's companion Irene. Despite signs of jealousy and envy, both seem to even be amused by it, although Leonor and Michel disappear for a while and drive to a nearby secluded bay. There, Michel has an emotional outburst, having evidently fallen in love with Leonor.

At the height of the party, a violent storm suddenly breaks out and the wind sweeps everything and everyone away, so that the party immediately breaks up.

Some time later, Irene and Michel return to the Azores. Leonor and Rogério invite them to dinner at their property, where five years earlier the storm so abruptly ended the garden party. Michel has not forgotten Leonor, and she too has retained her curiosity about the clever seducer Michel. The interrupted flirtation is now resumed by both of them, especially since Leonor is now bored with her monotonous married life and is evidently desperately longing for a change, driven by her suppressed inner urge for adventure.

Then things develop unexpectedly: Michel and Leonor disappear from the room after making unexpected confessions to each other. Meanwhile, Irene and Rogério continue to talk, with profound but also comical moments. When all four of them meet again in the room, the conversation continues with a series of mutual accusations, admissions and mind games. Irene invites Leonor to come with them and live together as a threesome. Leonor agrees, but ends up staying alone with Rogério. When Rogério tells her that he is now penniless, they suddenly find each other again and make plans for a new life. Leonor suggests setting up a wedding service in her castle.

== Style ==
Party seems like the film adaptation of a play with little plot and heavy dialogue. The protagonists speak their sarcastic, sometimes even provocative and insulting comments, or their existential confessions and philosophical reflections directly into the static camera. They are optically isolated and freed from their social context and from disturbing accessories. Background noises and colors are very restrained. The dialogues, mostly spoken in French, occasionally in Portuguese, seem like a sequence of short monologues on a stage due to the long takes and the camera's focus on the speakers.

== Cast ==
- Michel Piccoli as Michel
- Irene Papas as Irene
- Leonor Silveira as Leonor
- Rogério Samora as Rogério
- Sofia Alves as Rapariga

== Awards ==
Golden Globes (Portugal)

- Best Director
