= Eccentricities of a Blonde-Haired Girl =

- Film poster
- Directed by: Manoel de Oliveira
- Written by: Manoel de Oliveira; Eça de Queirós (short story)
- Produced by: François d'Artemare; Maria João Mayer; Luis Miñarro
- Starring: Ricardo Trêpa; Catarina Wallenstein
- Cinematography: Sabine Lancelin
- Edited by: Manoel de Oliveira; Catherine Krassovsky
- Release dates: February 10, 2009 (Berlin Film Festival); April 30, 2009 (Portugal)
- Running time: 64 minutes
- Country: Portugal
- Language: Portuguese

Eccentricities of a Blonde-Haired Girl (Portuguese: Singularidades de uma Rapariga Loura) is a 2009 Portuguese romance film directed by Manoel de Oliveira. Oliveira's grandson has a starring role. It played at the New York Film Festival and was released on DVD.

== Plot ==
Macário tells his story to a woman while on a train, telling her about his attraction to a woman named Luisa whom he first notices in a window across the street from his accounting office. With the help of a mutual acquaintance, Macário is introduced to Luisa at a salon. Macário asks his uncle, who is also his employer, if he can have his permission to marry Luisa. His uncle says that if he does marry her, he will be fired and will be disinherited. Despite his uncle's refusal, Macário decides that he wants to marry Luisa anyway. Due to his failure to find employment, Macário travels to Cape Verde to try to raise money as part of an unnamed business proposition. Macário manages to receive a fortune and his uncle later accepts the marriage. On a trip to buy a wedding ring, Macário discovers that Luisa is a shoplifter and does not marry her. As the story is told to the woman on the train, the outside scenery changes from snowy to green.

== Production ==
The film is based on a short story by 19th-century Portuguese writer Eça de Queiros. The director's grandson Ricardo Trêpa plays the role of Macário. A review from The New York Times described the film as "essentially a parable about romantic dreams" and that everything within it is framed, as in the film's plot is framed by the train trip, Luisa is framed by a window as well as seen through a window, and behind Luisa is a framed portrait.

Director Manoel de Oliveira completed the film when he was 100 years old, making him the oldest man to direct a feature film.

== Release ==
The film premiered at the Berlin International Film Festival, held at the Cinema Paris, on February 10, 2009. It was later shown at the New York Film Festival in the same year.

It was released on DVD by The Cinema Guild with the option to watch the Portuguese film with English subtitles. Inside the case is a paper insert with liner notes from James Quandt, who programs the TIFF Cinematheque. The special features are a trailer of the film, a trailer for the then upcoming film The Strange Case of Angelica, a 2009 press conference that took place at the 2009 Berlin Film Festival, and a short film directed by Oliveira titled The Panels of São Vincente de Fora – A Poetic Vision.

== Reception ==
Eccentricities of a Blonde-Haired Girl has received generally favorable reviews from critics. Rotten Tomatoes gave the film a rating of 77%, based on 22 reviews. Jamie S. Rich of DVD Talk wrote, "While I may soon forget the particulars of the script, I'll probably be thinking about how good Eccentricities of a Blonde-Haired Girl looked for quite a while."

Dennis Schwartz said in his review, "A mesmerizing, charming and disturbing morality tale of doomed love." Anthony Quinn, writing for The Independent wrote, "The story's period origins intrude here – how many young Portuguese professionals today would ask their uncle/employer for permission to marry? – but de Oliveira's dreamlike mood neutralises such implausibility."

=== Awards ===
- Golden Globes (Portugal) – Best Actress (Catarina Wallenstein)
