= No, or the Vain Glory of Command =

- Directed by: Manoel de Oliveira
- Written by: Manoel de Oliveira; P. João Marques
- Produced by: Paulo Branco
- Starring: Luís Miguel Cintra
- Cinematography: Elso Roque
- Edited by: Manoel de Oliveira
- Release date: 26 September 1990
- Running time: 110 minutes
- Country: Portugal
- Language: Portuguese

No, or the Vain Glory of Command (Portuguese: Non, ou a Vã Glória de Mandar) is a 1990 Portuguese film directed by Manoel de Oliveira. Starring Luís Miguel Cintra and Miguel Guilherme, the film portrays a series of defeats in Portuguese military history—such as the assassination of Viriathus, the Battle of Toro, the failed attempt at Iberian Union under Afonso of Portugal and Isabella of Spain, and the Battle of Alcácer Quibir. Additionally, it includes the episode of the Island of Love from The Lusiads. These events are recounted through flashbacks as a Portuguese lieutenant, stationed in an African territory during the Portuguese Colonial War (1961–74), narrates them while marching in 1974. He effortlessly draws his comrades into philosophical discussions, even as their small contingent endures surprise attacks from independence guerrillas.

The film was screened out of competition at the 1990 Cannes Film Festival.

== Plot ==
The narrative unfolds in early April 1974, within a Portuguese colony in Africa, though it remains ambiguous whether it is Portuguese Guinea, Angola, or Mozambique. A group of soldiers, led by Lieutenant Cabrita, traverses the jungle in a truck, heading toward a base from which they will engage in combat against guerrillas from a liberation movement. The soldiers, including Corporal Brito and Soldier Manoel, express a deep sense of fatalism and disillusionment, questioning the purpose of their continued involvement in the war. They recognize that Portugal is isolated, facing opposition not only from liberation movements but also from other African states and global powers like the U.S., USSR, China, and Europe, all of whom criticize and undermine the Portuguese colonial efforts.

Lieutenant Cabrita, who studied history before his military service, attempts to contextualize their situation through a series of historical flashbacks, drawing on key events from Portuguese history. The first flashback recounts the struggle of Viriathus against the Roman invaders in Lusitania. Viriathus, a successful guerrilla leader, ultimately fails to capitalize on the positive aspects of Roman civilization, thus missing the opportunity to establish a lasting kingdom.

The second flashback revisits Portugal's ambition to unite with Spain, which is thwarted during the Castilian War of Succession. King Afonso's defeat in the Battle of Toro in 1476 prevents the unification of the Iberian Peninsula. A third flashback follows, detailing a peaceful but unsuccessful attempt at unification through marriage, which is cut short by the untimely death of a Portuguese prince.

As the group camps in the jungle, Cabrita reflects on the futility of territorial conquests, emphasizing that what matters is what one contributes to humanity, not what one takes. He highlights the legacy of Portuguese exploration, citing Vasco da Gama’s journey to the mythical Isle of Love in a fourth flashback. Here, da Gama, aided by the goddess Venus, is rewarded by nymphs for his deeds and is shown the cosmic harmony of the world by the goddess Thetis.

The soldiers eventually reach their base camp, preparing for an engagement with the rebels the following day. That evening, Cabrita discusses the concept of the Fifth Empire, a utopian vision of a harmonious Catholic world empire that was championed by António Vieira and pursued by King Dom Sebastião. This leads to a fifth flashback depicting the ill-fated Battle of Alcácer Quibir in 1578, where Dom Sebastião, leading a diverse but disorganized army, meets disaster. The battle ends in a massacre, with the king's body never found, leaving him as a symbol of the lost hope of Sebastianism.

The next morning, the soldiers are ambushed by guerrillas, and Cabrita is seriously wounded. As he is airlifted to a military hospital, his consciousness drifts, placing him in the midst of the historical battle at Alcácer Quibir, where he envisions himself as Dom João of Portugal. He encounters a wounded knight who delivers a despairing monologue about the word "Non," symbolizing the destruction of hope. The knight ultimately kills himself.

In the hospital, Cabrita receives morphine, and in his delirium, he sees the spectral figure of Dom Sebastião, who squeezes his sword until blood drips from its tip, symbolically connecting to Cabrita's own fate. Despite medical efforts, Cabrita dies on April 25, 1974, a date that coincides with the Portuguese Carnation Revolution, marking the end of the colonial war. The film closes with credits rolling to the sound of a song from The Lusiads.

== Cast ==
- Luís Miguel Cintra – 2º Lt. Cabrita, Viriato, Dom João of Portugal
- Diogo Dória – Soldier Manuel, Lusitanian warrior, Dom João's cousin
- Miguel Guilherme – Soldier Salvador, Lusitanian warrior, Alcácer warrior
- Luís Lucas – Cpl. Brito, Lusitanian warrior, Alcácer nobleman
- Carlos Gomes – Soldier Pedro, Alcácer warrior
- António S. Lopes – Soldier, Lusitanian warrior, Alcácer warrior
- Mateus Lorena – Dom Sebastião
- Lola Forner – Princess Dona Isabel
- Raúl Fraire – Dom Afonso
- Ruy de Carvalho – Preacher at funeral, Suicidal warrior (as Rui de Carvalho)
- Teresa Menezes – Venus (as Teresa Meneses)
- Leonor Silveira – Tethys
- Paulo Matos – Radio operator, Vasco da Gama, Camões
- Francisco Baião – Prince Dom João
- Luís Mascarenhas – Dom Afonso V
- Duarte de Almeida – Baron of Alvito
