= Abraham's Valley =

- Portuguese theatrical release poster
- Portuguese: Vale Abraão
- Directed by: Manoel de Oliveira
- Screenplay by: Manoel de Oliveira
- Based on: The novel by Agustina Bessa-Luís
- Produced by: Paulo Branco
- Starring: Leonor Silveira; Luís Miguel Cintra; Ruy de Carvalho
- Narrated by: Mário Barroso
- Cinematography: Mário Barroso
- Edited by: Manoel de Oliveira; Valérie Loiseleux
- Production companies: Madragoa Filmes; Gemini Films; Light Night
- Release dates: May 1993 (Cannes); 15 October 1993 (Portugal)
- Running time: 187 minutes 203 minutes (director's cut)
- Countries: Portugal; France; Switzerland
- Language: Portuguese

Abraham's Valley (Portuguese: Vale Abraão) is a 1993 Portuguese drama film written and directed by Manoel de Oliveira, based on the novel of same name by Agustina Bessa-Luís, which is partially inspired by Gustave Flaubert's 1857 novel Madame Bovary. It stars Leonor Silveira, Luís Miguel Cintra and Ruy de Carvalho.

The film had its world premiere at the Directors' Fortnight section of the 1993 Cannes Film Festival, under the 3-hour cut initially edited aiming a main competition slot at the festival. It was theatrically released in Portugal on 15 October 1993.

It was selected as the Portuguese entry for the Best Foreign Language Film at the 66th Academy Awards, but was not nominated.

== Plot ==
Set in mid-20th century Portugal, in the vicinity of Lamego, Ema is a beautiful young girl who is married off to Carlos, an older doctor and friend of her father's. Dissatisfied, she takes several lovers.

== Cast ==
- Leonor Silveira as Ema Cardeano Paiva
  - Cécile Sanz de Alba as Young Ema
- Luís Miguel Cintra as Carlos Paiva
- Ruy de Carvalho as Paulino Cardeano, Ema's father
- Luís Lima Barreto as Pedro Luminares
- Micheline Larpin as Simona
- Diogo Dória as Fernando Osório
- José Pinto as Caires
- Filipe Cochofel as Fortunato

== Production ==
Abraham's Valley was filmed in 1.66:1 on 35 mm film by cinematographer Mário Barroso.

== Release ==
A restoration of the "Director's cut" (203 minutes version), ordered by the Cinemateca Portuguesa, had its world premiere once again at the Directors' Fortnight section of 2023 Cannes Film Festival. Leonor Silveira was also the face of that year section's poster.

It was re-released in Portuguese theaters on 2 April 2025 by Nitrato Filmes.

== Reception ==
=== Accolades and screenings ===
It won the Critics Award at the 1993 São Paulo International Film Festival and the Best Artistic Contribution Award at the 1993 Tokyo International Film Festival. It was screened at the 2023 Cannes Film Festival for the film's 30th anniversary.

== See also ==
- List of submissions to the 66th Academy Awards for Best Foreign Language Film
- List of Portuguese submissions for the Academy Award for Best Foreign Language Film
