= Glória de Matos =

Portuguese actress (1936–2025)

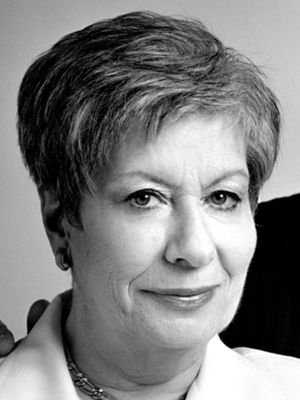

Maria da Glória Martins de Matos Mendes (30 May 1936 – 11 December 2025) was a Portuguese actress.

== Life and career ==
Matos was born in Lisbon on 30 May 1936. She began her acting career in 1954. She helped found the Casa da Comédia, where she was a resident actress and board member. As part of the Fernando Pessoa Group, she toured Brazil in 1962, and the following year, she settled in the United Kingdom. Thanks to a scholarship from the Calouste Gulbenkian Foundation, she graduated in theatre. In 1966, she began a collaboration with Raul Solnado, and in 1968 joined the Companhia Portuguesa de Comediantes. In 1969, she joined the company of the D. Maria II National Theatre. She received, among others, from the Portuguese Association of Theatre Critics the award for best actress, for her performance in Who's Afraid of Virginia Woolf? (1971), by Edward Albee.. In cinema, she made her debut in Operação Dinamite (1967), by Pedro Martins.

She was also a professor at the Theatre School of the National Conservatory, from 1971 to 1975, and at its successor, the Escola Superior de Teatro e Cinema, between 1980 and 1999.

In 2005, she joined, with actresses Fernanda Montemor, Maria José, Lia Gama and Lurdes Norberto, in the play A Mais Velha Profissão, by Paula Vogel, staged by Fernanda Lapa at the Teatro Nacional D. Maria II. This production received the Portuguese Golden Globe (2006), for "Best Play/Show".

She made her last performance in 2017, in the play "Odeio-te, Meu Amor", at the Teatro Nacional D. Maria II.

Matos died on 11 December 2025, at the age of 89.
