= Luís Miguel Cintra =

Portuguese actor (born 1949)

- Born: 29 April 1949 (age 77); Madrid, Spain
- Occupations: Actor, theater director
- Years active: 1970–present
- Awards: Pessoa Prize (2005)

Luís Miguel Valle Cintra (born 29 April 1949) is a Portuguese actor. He has appeared in more than 60 films since 1970. In 1973 Cintra founded the Teatro da Cornucópia with Jorge Silva Melo.

== Selected filmography ==
- A Ilha dos Amores (1982)
- The Distant Land (1987)
- O Desejado (1987)
- The Cannibals (1988)
- Non, ou a Vã Glória de Mandar (1990)
- Abraham's Valley (1993)
- The Convent (1995)
- Anxiety (1998)
- The Letter (1999)
- As Bodas de Deus (1999)
- April Captains (2000)
- The Dancer Upstairs (2002)
- The Uncertainty Principle (2002)
- Daqui P'rá Frente (2007)
- From Now On (2008)
- The Strange Case of Angelica (2010)
- Gebo et l'Ombre (2012)
