= Sophia Award for Best Film =

Portuguese film award category

- Prémio Sophia de Melhor Filme
- Awarded for: Best eligible feature film in Portuguese cinema
- Country: Portugal
- Presented by: Academia Portuguesa de Cinema
- First award: 2013
- Final award: present
- Currently held by: Banzo (2026)
- Website: academiadecinema.pt

The Sophia Award for Best Film is an annual award presented by the Academia Portuguesa de Cinema as part of the Prémios Sophia, Portugal's national film awards. It is the awards' main feature-film category.

The Prémios Sophia were first held on 26 November 2012 at the Cinemateca Portuguesa; that first edition was devoted to career awards. The Best Film category was first awarded at the 2013 ceremony, where Tabu won. The most recent winner is Banzo, which won in 2026.

== Winners and nominees ==
In the following tables, the years correspond to the year of the awards ceremony; the prize was not awarded in 2012, the 1st Sophia Award. Winners are listed first and highlighted in boldface with a yellow background, followed by the other nominees. Original Portuguese titles are provided alongside established English international titles.

While the award officially goes to the producers, both the directors and producers of the films are listed in the table for thorough identification.

=== 2010s ===
Year	English title	Original title	Director(s)	Producer(s)
2013 (2nd)	**Tabu**	**Tabu**	**Miguel Gomes**	**Sandro Aguilar, Luís Urbano**
2013 (2nd)	Florbela	Florbela	Vicente Alves do Ó	Pandora da Cunha Telles, Pablo Iraola
2013 (2nd)	Lines of Wellington	Linhas de Wellington	Valeria Sarmiento	Paulo Branco
2013 (2nd)	Operation Autumn	Operação Outono	Bruno de Almeida	Paulo Branco
2014 (3rd)	**The Last Time I Saw Macao**	**A Última Vez Que Vi Macau**	**João Pedro Rodrigues, João Rui Guerra da Mata**	**João Figueiras**
2014 (3rd)	See You Tomorrow, Comrades	Até Amanhã Camaradas	Joaquim Leitão	Tino Navarro
2014 (3rd)	Night Train to Lisbon	Comboio Noturno para Lisboa	Bille August	Ana Costa, Paulo Branco
2014 (3rd)	É o Amor	É o Amor	João Canijo	Pedro Borges
2014 (3rd)	Fourth Division	Quarta Divisão	Joaquim Leitão	Tino Navarro
2015 (4th)	**Cats Don't Have Vertigo**	**Os Gatos não Têm Vertigens**	**António-Pedro Vasconcelos**	**Tino Navarro**
2015 (4th)	The Invisible Life	A Vida Invisível	Vítor Gonçalves	Maria João Sigalho
2015 (4th)	The Great Kilapy	O Grande Kilapy	Zézé Gamboa	Fernando Vendrell
2015 (4th)	The Maias: Story of a Portuguese Family	Os Maias: Cenas da Vida Romântica	João Botelho	Alexandre Oliveira
2016 (5th)	**Impossible Love**	**Amor Impossível**	**António-Pedro Vasconcelos**	**Tino Navarro**
2016 (5th)	Mountain	Montanha	João Salaviza	François d'Artemare
2016 (5th)	Yvone Kane	Yvone Kane	Margarida Cardoso	Maria João Mayer
2016 (5th)	Arabian Nights: Volume 2 – The Desolate One	As Mil e Uma Noites: Volume 2, O Desolado	Miguel Gomes	Sandro Aguilar, Luís Urbano
2017 (6th)	**Letters from War**	**Cartas da Guerra**	**Ivo M. Ferreira**	**Sandro Aguilar, Luís Urbano**
2017 (6th)	Grey and Black	Cinzento e Negro	Luís Filipe Rocha	António da Cunha Telles
2017 (6th)	Mother Knows Best	A Mãe é que Sabe	Nuno Rocha	Pandora da Cunha Telles, Pablo Iraola
2017 (6th)	I Was in Lisbon and Remembered You	Estive em Lisboa e Lembrei de Você	José Barahona	David & Golias, Refinaria Filmes
2018 (7th)	**Saint George**	**São Jorge**	**Marco Martins**	**Maria João Mayer, François d'Artemare**
2018 (7th)	The Nothing Factory	A Fábrica de Nada	Pedro Pinho	João Matos
2018 (7th)	Fátima	Fátima	João Canijo	Pedro Borges
2018 (7th)	Al Berto	Al Berto	Vicente Alves do Ó	Pandora da Cunha Telles, Pablo Iraola
2019 (8th)	**Rage**	**Raiva**	**Sérgio Tréfaut**	**Sérgio Tréfaut**
2019 (8th)	Cabaret Maxime	Cabaret Maxime	Bruno de Almeida	Bruno de Almeida
2019 (8th)	Parque Mayer	Parque Mayer	António-Pedro Vasconcelos	Tino Navarro
2019 (8th)	Soldier Millions	Soldado Milhões	Gonçalo Galvão Teles, Jorge Paixão da Costa	Pandora da Cunha Telles, Pablo Iraola

=== 2020s ===
Year	English title	Original title	Director(s)	Producer(s)
2020 (9th)	**The Domain**	**A Herdade**	**Tiago Guedes**	**Paulo Branco**
2020 (9th)	Diamantino	Diamantino	Gabriel Abrantes, Daniel Schmidt	Maria João Mayer
2020 (9th)	Variações: Guardian Angel	Variações	João Maia	Fernando Vendrell
2020 (9th)	Vitalina Varela	Vitalina Varela	Pedro Costa	Abel Ribeiro Chaves
2021 (10th)	**Listen**	**Listen**	**Ana Rocha de Sousa**	**Rodrigo Areias**
2021 (10th)	Mosquito	Mosquito	João Nuno Pinto	Paulo Branco
2021 (10th)	The Year of the Death of Ricardo Reis	O Ano da Morte de Ricardo Reis	João Botelho	Alexandre Oliveira
2021 (10th)	Moral Order	Ordem Moral	Mário Barroso	Paulo Branco
2022 (11th)	**The Last Bath**	**O Último Banho**	**David Bonneville**	**Isabel Machado, Joana Ferreira, Jasmina Sijercic**
2022 (11th)	Bem Bom	Bem Bom	Patrícia Sequeira	Patrícia Sequeira
2022 (11th)	Shadow	Sombra	Bruno Gascon	Joana Domingues
2022 (11th)	Terra Nova	Terra Nova	Artur Ribeiro	Ana Costa
2023 (12th)	**Alma Viva**	**Alma Viva**	**Cristèle Alves Meira**	**Pedro Borges**
2023 (12th)	Wolf and Dog	Lobo e Cão	Cláudia Varejão	João Matos
2023 (12th)	Nothing Ever Happened	Nunca Nada Aconteceu	Gonçalo Galvão Teles	Luís Galvão Teles
2023 (12th)	Remains of the Wind	Restos do Vento	Tiago Guedes	Paulo Branco
2024 (13th)	**Bad Living**	**Mal Viver**	**João Canijo**	**Pedro Borges**
2024 (13th)	Great Yarmouth: Provisional Figures	Great Yarmouth: Provisional Figures	Marco Martins	Filipa Reis
2024 (13th)	Tommy Guns	Nação Valente	Carlos Conceição	Leonor Noivo, João Matos, Carlos Conceição
2024 (13th)	The Nothingness Club	Não Sou Nada – The Nothingness Club	Edgar Pêra	Rodrigo Areias
2025 (14th)	**Grand Tour**	**Grand Tour**	**Miguel Gomes**	**Filipa Reis**
2025 (14th)	The Buriti Flower	A Flor do Buriti	João Salaviza, Renée Nader Messora	João Salaviza, Renée Nader Messora, Ricardo Alves Jr., Julia Alves
2025 (14th)	O Teu Rosto Será o Último	O Teu Rosto Será o Último	Luís Filipe Rocha	Pandora da Cunha Telles, Pablo Iraola
2025 (14th)	Revolução (sem) Sangue	Revolução (sem) Sangue	Rui Pedro Sousa	Sónia Resende, Rui Pedro Sousa, Nuno Rocha, Roberto Santos, Victor Santos
2026 (15th)	**Banzo**	**Banzo**	**Margarida Cardoso**	**Filipa Reis**
2026 (15th)	The Scent of Things Remembered	A Memória do Cheiro das Coisas	António Ferreira	Tathiani Sacilotto, António Ferreira
2026 (15th)	I Only Rest in the Storm	O Riso e a Faca	Pedro Pinho	Filipa Reis, Tiago Hespanha, Pedro Pinho
2026 (15th)	On Falling	On Falling	Laura Carreira	Mário Patrocínio
