= Frames - Portuguese Film Festival =

Film festival in Sweden

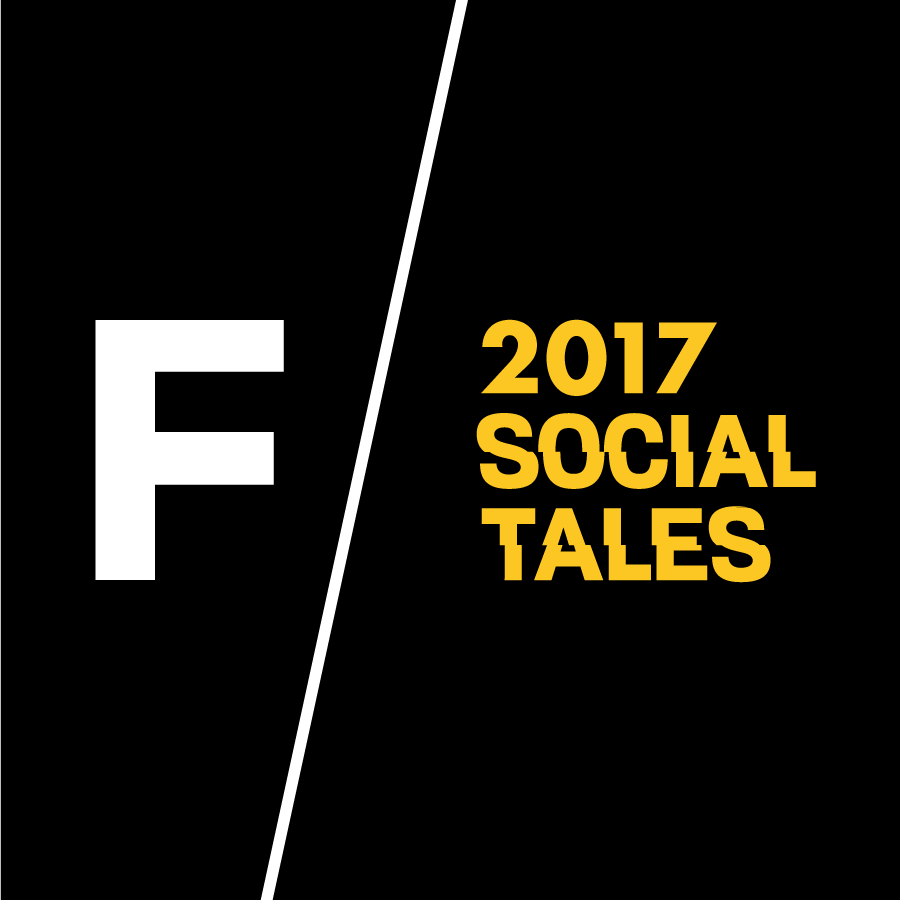
Frames – Portuguese Film Festival 2017

Frames – Portuguese Film Festival is a film festival dedicated to Portuguese cinema, taking place since 2013 in the Swedish cities of Stockholm, Västerås and Gothenburg.

== History ==
The first edition of the Frames – Portuguese Film Festival took place in 2013 at Filmhuset in Stockholm, between 16 and 22 of November. This initiative originated from the efforts of Ung FAPS, the association of young Portuguese people in Stockholm, wishing the festival could become a significant cultural gathering platform for the Portuguese community in Sweden. The festival seeks to promote the most recent, original and creative content within the Portuguese cinematographic panorama, as well as introduce new and talented Portuguese filmmakers to the Swedish public. Cinema, the main focus of the event, is broadened by other cultural expressions, such as literature, debates and music events.

Memory was the underlying subject of the 2014 edition that took place between 24 and 29 November at Filmhuset in Stockholm, with also a day session in Gothenburg, at Bio Roy movie theater.

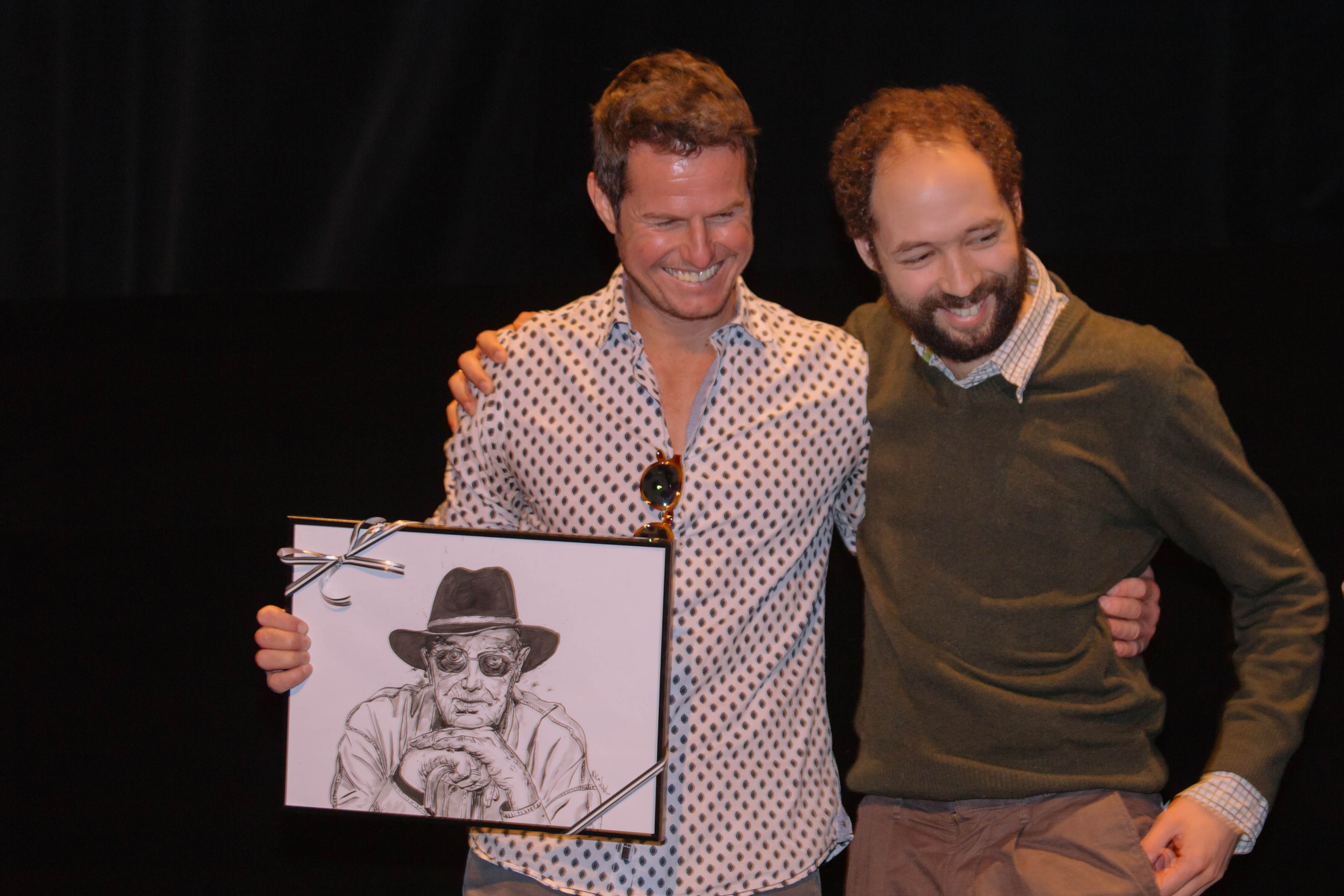
Ricardo Trêpa, actor and grandson of Manoel de Oliveira, the world renowned Portuguese director, was present in the edition of 2016

"What is memory? What does the act of remembering entail? How do we relate to our past in individual and collective ways?" Under Memory, several topics were addressed such as the feminist presence within Portuguese cinema, the politics of colonialism, the AIDS epidemic, and also the 40 year anniversary of the Portuguese revolution (which meant the end of the 48 year-long-dictatorship in Portugal) were subjects addressed by the films presented.

In 2016, under the theme Roots, the festival spread for the first time to three different cities, Stockholm, Västerås and Gothenburg, starting on the 22 February, and having the last session on 6 March. This edition placed its focus on the concept of family through the exhibition of contemporary films, as well as documentaries produced in Portugal. What is family? and which are its invoked affects? Roots are not only a starting point but also what underpins an internal and external structure.

Social Tales is the theme of the fourth edition of Frames – Portuguese Film Festival in 2017. It will take place in Stockholm between 18 and 21 February, in Västerås and Gothenburg, similar to the 2016 edition. This theme will reveal cinema as a political gesture, through fiction and realistic depictions. Featured films will place focus on current social issues such as social organization, inequality and discrimination, which will serve as a stimulus for debate during the festival. This year, for the first time, the festival will include a Competitive Section with a prize awarded by a jury. This competition aims to bring an element of public participation and engagement to the festival. Any professional or amateur filmmaker can submit a short-film, as along as the producer/director is Portuguese or that the movie takes place in Portugal.

== Platforms of action ==
Screening of Portuguese films

- Screening of Portuguese feature and short films in the cities of Stockholm, Gothenburg and Västerås;
- Interviews and debates with invited actors and directors

Frames Kids

- Screening of Portuguese animation films for the younger audience;
- Pedagogical activities related to the films' content, developed by Portuguese teachers in Sweden

Competitive Section

- Screening of short films competing for a prize awarded by a jury

Portuguese cultural events

- Organisation of opening concerts for the festival

== Prizes ==
Competitive Section

- Grand Prize for Best Short Film
- Special Mention for Best Short Film

== Past editions ==
=== 2016 – Roots ===
- The Old Man of Belem (2014) – Manoel de Oliveira
- How to draw a perfect circle (2009) – Marco Martins
- José and Pilar (2010) – Miguel Gonçalves Mendes
- Blood of my blood (2011) – João Canijo
- Our way of life (2011) – Pedro Filipe Marques
- Morning light (2012) – Cláudia Varejão
- Bad blood (2013) – André Santos, Marco Leão
- Gypsophila (2015) – Margarida Leitão
- Mountain (2015) – João Salaviza

=== 2014 – Memory ===
- Alice (2005) – Marco Martins
- Tomorrow (2006) – Solveig Nordlund
- Red Line (2011) – José Filipe Costa
- Tabu (2012) – Miguel Gomes
- What Now? Remind Me (2013) – Joaquim Pinto
- Mitt andra land (2014) – Solveig Nordlund

=== 2013 ===
- Rapace (2006) – João Nicolau
- Our Beloved Month of August (2008) – Miguel Gomes
- To Die Like a Man (2009) – João Pedro Rodrigues
- Arena (2009) – João Salaviza
- Our Man (2011) – Pedro Costa
- Liberdade (2011) – Gabriel Abrantes
- No Man's Land (2012) – Salomé Lamas
- Rafa (2012) – João Salaviza
- Cerro Negro (2012) – João Salaviza
- It's the Earth Not the Moon (2011) – Gonçalo Tocha

== See also ==
- Västerås
- Stockholm
- Gothenburg
