= Banzo =

Banzo may refer to:

- Brazilian slaves' feeling of banzo related to homesickness, akin to Welsh hiraeth
- Eduardo López Banzo, Spanish conductor
- Charan Banzo, Indian film music composer for the film Lodde

== Art and entertainment ==
- Banzo (2024 film), a Portuguese drama film
