= The Face You Deserve =

- Portuguese: A Cara que Mereces
- Directed by: Miguel Gomes
- Starring: José Airosa; Gracinda Nave; Sara Graça; Miguel Barroso; João Nicolau; Ricardo Gross; Rui Catalão; António Figueiredo; Manuel Mozos; Carloto Cotta; Pedro Caldas
- Release date: 2004
- Running time: 108 minutes
- Country: Portugal
- Language: Portuguese

The Face You Deserve (Portuguese: A Cara que Mereces) is a 2004 Portuguese film directed by Miguel Gomes.

== Cast ==
- José Airosa
- Gracinda Nave
- Sara Graça
- Miguel Barroso
- João Nicolau
- Ricardo Gross
- Rui Catalão
- António Figueiredo
- Manuel Mozos
- Carloto Cotta
- Pedro Caldas

== Reception ==
In Público's Ípsilon, Kathleen Gomes and Luís Miguel Oliveira gave the film a rating of "good" and Mário Jorge Torres gave it a rating of "bad".
