= Adonis Kapsalis =

Greek-American actor

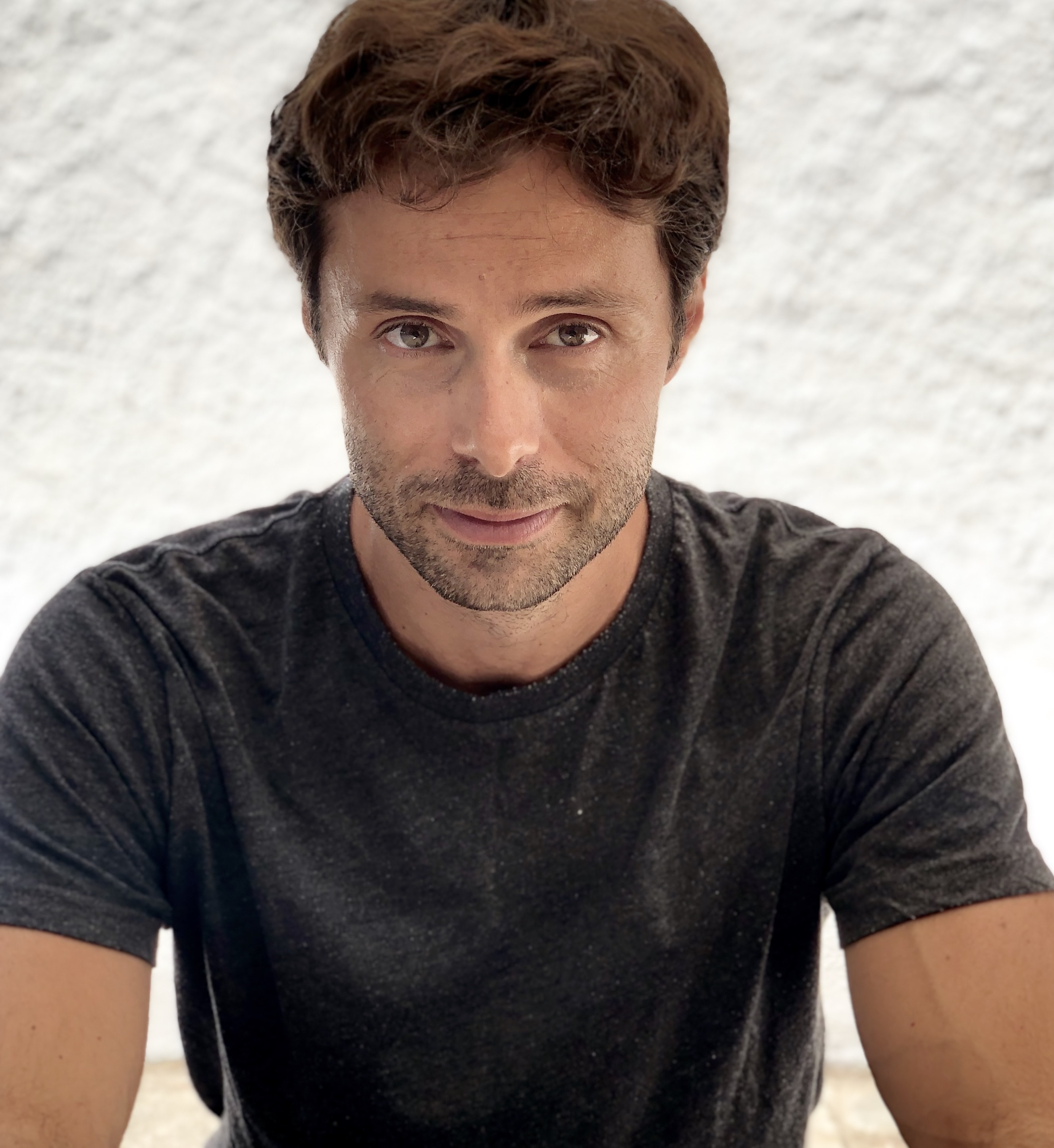
- Kapsalis in 2023
- Born: November 11, 1980 (age 45); Greece
- Citizenship: Greece; United States
- Education: The American Musical and Dramatic Academy
- Occupations: Actor, screenwriter, producer
- Years active: 2001–present

Adonis Kapsalis (Greek: Αντώνης Καψάλης; born November 11, 1980) is a Greek-American actor known for such television shows as Netflix's The Crown, Showtime's Homeland and the 2012 Greek drama film Meteora.

== Early life and education ==
Kapsalis was born in Thessaloniki and has lived in New York City, Los Angeles and London.

He studied at The American Musical and Dramatic Academy in New York City.

== Career ==
Kapsalis' early career included performances in several Off-Broadway plays before moving to the screen.

His TV debut was in the TV series Sex and the City, followed by appearances on HBO's made-for-cable film Angels in America, CBS's As The World Turns and the 2014 action/comedy film The Sky is Blue.

In 2010, Kapsalis was in talks to co-star alongside Olympia Dukakis for the 2015 American film Bereave.

Kapsalis is currently set to star in Chandu Champion, a feature film directed by Kabir Khan.

== Production ==
Kapsalis served as associate-producer on the 2012 independent film Meteora, which was nominated for the Golden Bear at the 62nd Berlin International Film Festival in February 2012.

== Filmography ==
=== Film ===
Year	Title	screenWriter	Producer	Role	Notes
2024	Chandu Champion			Carlos Pedroza	Feature Film
2015	The Sky is Blue			Bouncer	Feature Film
2012	Hunting My Blood			Chris/Thomas	Short Film
2013	The Failure			Don Rind	Feature Film
2007	Bling: A Planet Rock			American TV Reporter	Feature Film
2005	Remedy			Art Dealer	Feature Film
2005	Jokebitch				
2004	Blur				
2020	Bet on Love	Yes	Yes		In development
2020	Shambhala	Yes	Yes		In development
2012	Meteora	No	Yes	Dimitreus	Associate Producer; Feature Film

=== Television ===
Year	Title	Role	Notes
2026	Silo	Straggler	Episode: A Dark Web
2022	The Crown	Captain Fletcher	Episode: Decommissioned
2020	Homeland	First Guard	Episode: "2 Minutes"
2012	Guys Choice Awards	Movie Star	Episodes: TV Special
2007	As The World Turns	Rex	Episode: "#1.13034"
2003	Sex and The City	Patron	Episode: "The Post-It Always Sticks Twice"
2003	Angels in America	Mourner	Episode: "Millennium Approaches: Bad News"
