= Carloto Cotta =

Portuguese actor (born 1984)

- Born: 31 January 1984; Paris, France
- Occupations: Actor, musician
- Years active: 2003–present
- Awards: Best Actor, Portuguese Golden Globes (2019)

Carloto Cotta (born 31 January 1984) is a Portuguese actor, musician, and animal philanthropist. He is renowned for roles as Diamantino Matamouros in Diamantino (2018), for which he won a best actor award at the 2019 Portuguese Golden Globes, as the Young Ventura in Tabu (2012) and as Carloto himself in The Tsugua Diaries (2021).

== Early life and education ==
Cotta was born in Paris. He comes from a family of artistic and colonial backgrounds. His grandparents from his father's side were opera singers at the National Theatre of Saint Charles. His father exposed him at an early age to theatre's life at Teatro da Comuna and put him to play in a French historical drama series by Fernando Vendrell, in the role of a young Baudelaire. Due to his close relationship with his grandmother, he often attended the opera and neighbourhood cinemas.

At the age of 15, while attending Plastic Arts, he decided to quit and join a professional course. He was lost, not knowing his calling. He painted, drew, sculpted, made music, wrote, and a series of other activities which made him feel connected to the world of arts and creation. When he joins the Professional Theatre School of Cascais, he didn't yet know the power of acting. He was supposed to study scenic design, but the course was closed. He ended up in the theater course, discovering the magic of the stage, of character creation and working with the body. “The body became my brush, my pen, my guitar, my work tool. It was a completely new discovery”. With the mentorship of Carlos Avilez and João Vasco, Carloto learned to respect values of discipline, earnestness, rigor and devotion for character shaping and theatrical performance. Reflecting back on this period, Carloto recognises an irreverent, rebellious actor in the way of doing things and always full of desire to challenge norms, to question conventions, which can sometimes be confused with a certain indiscipline or lack of seriousness. It was always a kind of punk response he had, a streak of irreverence. He thinks there was a natural evolution. "Some works went well, others didn't", with the actor considering as the most important to learn from mistakes. Maybe I was less afraid when I was a child, more afraid of some things and less afraid of others. My priorities have been reorganised along this journey

== Career ==
Carloto Cotta's career spans more than 20 years and 45 productions for the cinema, television and theatre, an annual rate of 2.25 productions, rendering him as one of the most prolific Portuguese actors of his generation, a versatile shaper of complex characters and a contributor to Portuguese post-revolutionary history, through the cinema and television. In his films, Carloto collaborates recurrently with Miguel Gomes, João Salaviza, Gabriel Abrantes & Daniel Schmidt, as well as Raúl Ruiz until his passing over. He was also directed by Margarida Cardoso, Margarida Gil and Christine Laurent until her pass over.

=== 2000s: early works (selected) ===
Following stage productions, including The Mother, by Bertolt Brecht, Carloto debuts his film career with the short-film 31 (2003), followed by Cara que mereces (2004) by Miguel Gomes.

In 2005 Carloto plays Alberto in Odete by João Pedro Rodrigues. Alberto is a security guard in a hypermarket who dates Odete and runs away when she insists on getting pregnant. Alberto doesn't want commitments.

With Arena (2009) by João Salaviza, Carloto wins national and international recognition, as the short wins Short Film Palme d'Or at the 2009 Cannes Film Festival. In Arena, Carloto is a young man under house arrest who spends his time in the best way he can by making some tattoos. His relative peace is strangely disturbed when he's attacked and robbed by three kids from the neighborhood. From then on, he'll try to find the kids who took his money and maybe give them a lesson. But with those actions, comes the reflection of how things were and are in this place filled with violence and hostility. Is change possible?

In How to Draw a Perfect Circle (2009) by Marco Martins, Carloto is the ‘boy at a party’. This film explores biological taboos between twin brother and sister, following parental separation and absence. Guilherme and Sofia grow up sharing experiences and slowly discovering their sexuality. The thing that Sofia doesn't know is how far Guilherme will go to keep her inside his own perverse, dark and perfect circle.

=== 2010s ===
In Mysteries of Lisbon (2010) one of the works of Raul Ruiz, Carloto plays D. Álvaro de Albuquerque, the illegitimate father of the main protagonist, believed to be orphan Father Dinis. This film plunges the viewer into a whirlwind of adventures and misadventures, coincidences and revelations, feelings and violent passions, revenge, unfortunate and illegitimate loves on a troubled journey through Portugal, France, Italy and Brazil, crossing the history of the XIX century Lisbon and Father Dinis search for identity

In the last production of Raúl Ruiz, alongside producer Paulo Branco, Lines of Wellington (2012) by Valeria Sarmiento, Carloto plays Pedro de Alencar. Alencar is an idealistic young lieutenant wounded with a traumatic head injury affecting his perceptions and who gets increasingly impatient, as memory and consciousness return, to resume his role as lieutenant in the organisation of common people and army for building the fortifications lines against the third Napoleonic invasion of Portugal

Bairro followed in 2013 for television, by Jorge Cardoso, Lourenço de Mello, José Manuel Fernandes, Ricardo Inácio with Carloto as Batman in a popular police crime drama starring Maria João Bastos as Diana, an emotionally stunted violent gang leader and killer.

In 2015, in the triptych Arab Nights by Miguel Gomes, Carloto plays, in volume 1: The Restless One, the role of a Translator in one of Xerazade (Crista Alfaiate) night stories. In this lullaby between the Troika and caricatures of Portuguese politicians, the Translator is bewildered and somehow lost in translation by the conversation, which led to the reestructuring in real life of the Estaleiros Navais de Viana do Castelo (ENVC). In volume 2: The Desolate One, Carloto plays Careto in the Tears of the Judge lullaby and in volume 3: The Enchanted One, Cotta plays a Paddleman. So realism

In 2018, Carloto features as Fernando Pessoa himself in the short How Fernando Pessoa saved Portugal by Eugène Green. In this story, Pessoa, at the behest of an employer, crafts a slogan for the drink Coca-Louca, panicking the authoritarian government.

In Diamantino (2018) by Gabriel Abrantes & Daniel Schmidt, Cotta is a world star football player who loses his mojo after losing his father and accidentally getting involved in the rescue of migrants. The film won 4 international awards, including top prize at Cannes Critics’ Week, with critics highlighting Cotta well cast as a vacant national treasure and often endearingly stupid. Carloto Cotta won the first Portuguese recognition of his career as Best Actor in the 2019 PT Golden Globes.

=== 2020s ===
The Tsugua Diaries (2021) is a film that tells the story of a COVID-19 lockdown in reverse order. In the movie, Carloto plays himself. In one scene, both fellow cast members and crew get upset at him for his need to go surfing during production pause (folga) thus breaking the sanitary cordon and risk infecting the whole crew.

In the international horror fantasy production You Won't be Alone (2022) by Goran Stolevski, Maria – a "Wolf-Eateress", devours Boris, Carloto's character, who's lured by her shapeshifting as a dog.

Cotta stars in another horror fantasy in 2023, Amelia's Children by Gabriel Abrantes. According to one critic, Cotta has a face fit for farce, with puzzled, wide eyes that Abrantes takes great pleasure in pulling the wool over. It's enough fun just to see him get taken for a ride.

In Banzo (2024) by Margarida Cardoso, which confronts the violence of the Portuguese colonial past in farms for Cacao beans in São Tomé and Príncipe, Carloto plays Afonso. Afonso is a medical doctor sent to cure a group of servants “infected” by Banzo, a severe form of homesickness afflicting slaves. Dozens of them die from starvation or suicide. For fear of spreading Banzo, the group is sent to an isolated, rainy hill, surrounded by forest. There, Afonso tries to cure the servants, but his inability to understand what is going on in their souls proves stronger than all solutions.

== Personal life ==
Asked about his sexuality, Cotta has said that he doesn't appreciate sexual labels, and explained: "I don't define myself sexually. Now I'm 'one thing', and perhaps two years from now I'm 'something else'."

Little is known about Carloto Cotta's personal life, with the actor often preferring to discuss books, films, production methods, his characters, philosophy and spirituality in his rare interviews. The actor expressed difficulties in distancing himself from his characters: “the characters move me”^{,}. Unexpressed emotions never die, they come back later in the form of illness.

In 2025, in the backdrop of an act of aggression against women every 22 minutes in Portugal and a citizens’ petition with more than 125 000 signatures for transforming rape into a public crime and ‘autonomise the crime of femicide’, Carloto was formally charged with 9 crimes of sexual violence against an unidentified woman by Marleen Cooreman of the Prosecutor General's Office (PGO). In 2023, the Portuguese Criminal Investigation Police (PJ) collected statements from the victim, the suspect and witnesses. It concluded that the investigation “did not allow information to be brought to the records or (...) verification of a crime against the complainant's sexual freedom”, and proposed archiving the complaint. The public prosecutor still considered the complainant's statements to be credible.

Carloto is currently awaiting trial by a panel of judges.

According to one public account, some of his social media followers recognised a parallel with a horror story Carloto experienced in the acting role of João Lucas in Paixão by Margarida Gil (2012). In this film, Carloto Cotta, as João Lucas, is lured into imprisonement by a woman who had lost all her family. According to another account, the Portuguese Radio and Television drafted Carloto to play Frederico, a woman aggressor, in a miniseries about violence against women Casa Abrigo, suggestive of a public conviction and state instrumentalisation of the actor before a formal and fair judiciary trial.

== Animal philanthropy ==
Carloto often expresses his compassion for animals in general and street dogs in particular. While turning Banzo he embraced the cause of the nonprofit organisation AMA, calling for financial support and volunteering in São Tomé e Príncipe. He also adopted two dogs. He stated that animals in São Tomé are in great suffering. There are colonies of dogs on the street. And dogs that come from a survivalist lineage, as soon as they feel the first promise of affection, they stick with you immediately. They are incredibly delicate and kind.

In the hyperrealistic piece The Tsugua Diaries (2022) the public sees Carloto as Carloto washing one of the dog-actors.

== Political views ==
"That we would all be more like brothers and sisters in a few years. I would like to see that".

== Filmography ==
=== Film ===
- 2024 – Banzo
- 2023 – Amelia's Children by Gabriel Abrantes
- 2022 – You Won't Be Alone by Goran Stolevski
- 2019 – Frankie by Ira Sachs
- 2018 – Diamantino by Gabriel Abrantes & Daniel Schmidt
- 2015 – The 1001 Nights by Miguel Gomes
- 2015 – Montanha by João Salaviza
- 2014 – Olvidados by Carlos Bolado
- 2013 – Bairro by Jorge Cardoso, José Manuel Fernandes, Lourenço Mello, Ricardo Inácio
- 2012 – Lines of Wellington by Valeria Sarmiento
- 2012 – Tabu by Miguel Gomes
- 2012 – Paixão by Margarida Gil
- 2011 – Fratelli by Gabriel Abrantes
- 2011 – Demain by Christine Laurent
- 2010 – Mysteries of Lisbon by Raúl Ruiz
- 2010 – Carne by Carlos Conceição
- 2010 – Senhor X by Gonçalo Galvão Teles
- 2009 – To Die Like a Man by João Pedro Rodrigues
- 2009 – La Religieuse Portugaise by Eugène Green
- 2009 – Arena by João Salaviza
- 2009 – L'Arc En Ciel by David Bonneville
- 2009 – Soy un hombre sincero by Jaime Freitas
- 2008 – 4 Copas by Manuel Mozos
- 2008 – Nuit de Chien by Werner Schroeter
- 2007 – The Golden Helmet by Jorge Cramez
- 2006 – The End by Vitor Candeias
- 2005 – Aqui estou eu by Jaime Freitas
- 2005 – Two Drifters by João Pedro Rodrigues
- 2005 – Fin de curso by Miguel Martí
- 2004 – A Cara Que Mereces by Miguel Gomes
- 2003 – 31 by Miguel Gomes

=== Television ===
- 2025 – Casa Abrigo, RTP
- 2025 – Manual Para Señoritas, Netflix
- 2022-2023 – Elite, Netflix
- 2021 – Glória, Netflix
- 2019 – A Prisioneira, TVI
- 2016 – Mata Hari – Théophile Rastignac – Starmedia
- 2016 – A Impostora, TVI
- 2015 – Santa Bárbara TVI
- 2012 – O Bairro TVI
- 2010 – Laços de Sangue SIC
- 2008 – Flor do Mar TVI
- 2007 – Ilha dos Amores TVI
- 2006 – A Minha Família RTP
- 2002 – Lusitana Paixão RTP

== Theater ==
- 2008 – The Mother, Bertolt Brecht
- 2007 – Shopping and Fucking, Mark Ravenhill
- 2006 – Me Cago en Dios, Ìñigo Ramirez de Haro
