= Amelia's Children =

- Theatrical release poster
- Portuguese: A Semente do Mal
- Directed by: Gabriel Abrantes
- Written by: Gabriel Abrantes
- Produced by: Gabriel Abrantes; Margarida Lucas
- Starring: Jack Haven (Note: Credited as Brigette Lundy-Paine; Haven came out as non-binary and changed their name in 2025.); Carloto Cotta; Anabela Moreira; Alba Baptista; Rita Blanco
- Cinematography: Vasco Viana
- Edited by: Margarida Lucas
- Music by: Gabriel Abrantes
- Production company: Artificial Humors
- Distributed by: NOS Audiovisuais
- Release dates: 16 September 2023 (MOTELx); 18 January 2024 (Portugal)
- Running time: 91 minutes
- Country: Portugal
- Languages: English; Portuguese
- Box office: $1.4 million

Amelia's Children (Portuguese: A Semente do Mal, lit. 'The Seed of Evil') is a 2023 Portuguese supernatural horror film written and directed by Gabriel Abrantes. It stars Jack Haven, Carloto Cotta, Anabela Moreira, Alba Baptista, and Rita Blanco.

The film follows Edward (Cotta) and Riley (Haven), an American couple who goes to a villa in the North of Portugal where Edward's biological family lives. In the villa, they quickly discover that his family is linked to a monstrous secret.

Amelia's Children had its premiere at the MOTELx Lisbon International Horror Film Festival on 16 September 2023, and was released theatrically in Portugal on 18 January 2024 by NOS Audiovisuais. It received mixed reviews from critics and grossed $1.4 million.

== Cast ==
- Jack Haven as Riley
- Carloto Cotta as Edward "Ed" / Manuel / Artur
- Anabela Moreira as Amelia
  - Alba Baptista as young Amelia
- Rita Blanco as Sra. Vieira

Additionally, Valdemar Santos appears as Sra. Vieira's friend, Beatriz Maia as Sra. Vieira's daughter, while Sónia Balacó and Ana Tang play Amelia's lawyers. Nuno Nolasco appears as a flight attendant and serves as Cotta's stunt double, and Linda Ferreira serves as Moreira's stunt double.

== Release ==
The film was released on 18 January 18 2024 by NOS Audiovisuais after premiering at the MOTELx Lisbon International Horror Film Festival on 16 September 2023. In the United States, the film was released in theaters and on VOD on 1 March 2024 by Magnet Releasing.

== Reception ==
The film has a 38% rating on Rotten Tomatoes based on 16 reviews. Simon Abrams of RogerEbert.com awarded the film three stars. Brennan Klein of Screen Rant awarded the film two and a half stars out of five. David Ehrlich of IndieWire graded the film a B−. Chase Hutchinson of Collider scored the film a 3 out of 10.

Jeannette Catsoulis of The New York Times gave the film a negative review and wrote, "A hilariously awful collision of soap opera and horror movie, Amelia’s Children teeters so precariously on the cliff top of comedy that one wishes the director, Gabriel Abrantes, had dared to kick it over the edge."

J. Kim Murphy of Variety gave the film a positive review and wrote, "Cotta has a face fit for farce, with puzzled, wide eyes that Abrantes takes great pleasure in pulling the wool over. It’s enough fun just to see him get taken for a ride."
