= Un Certain Regard =

Section of the Cannes Film Festival

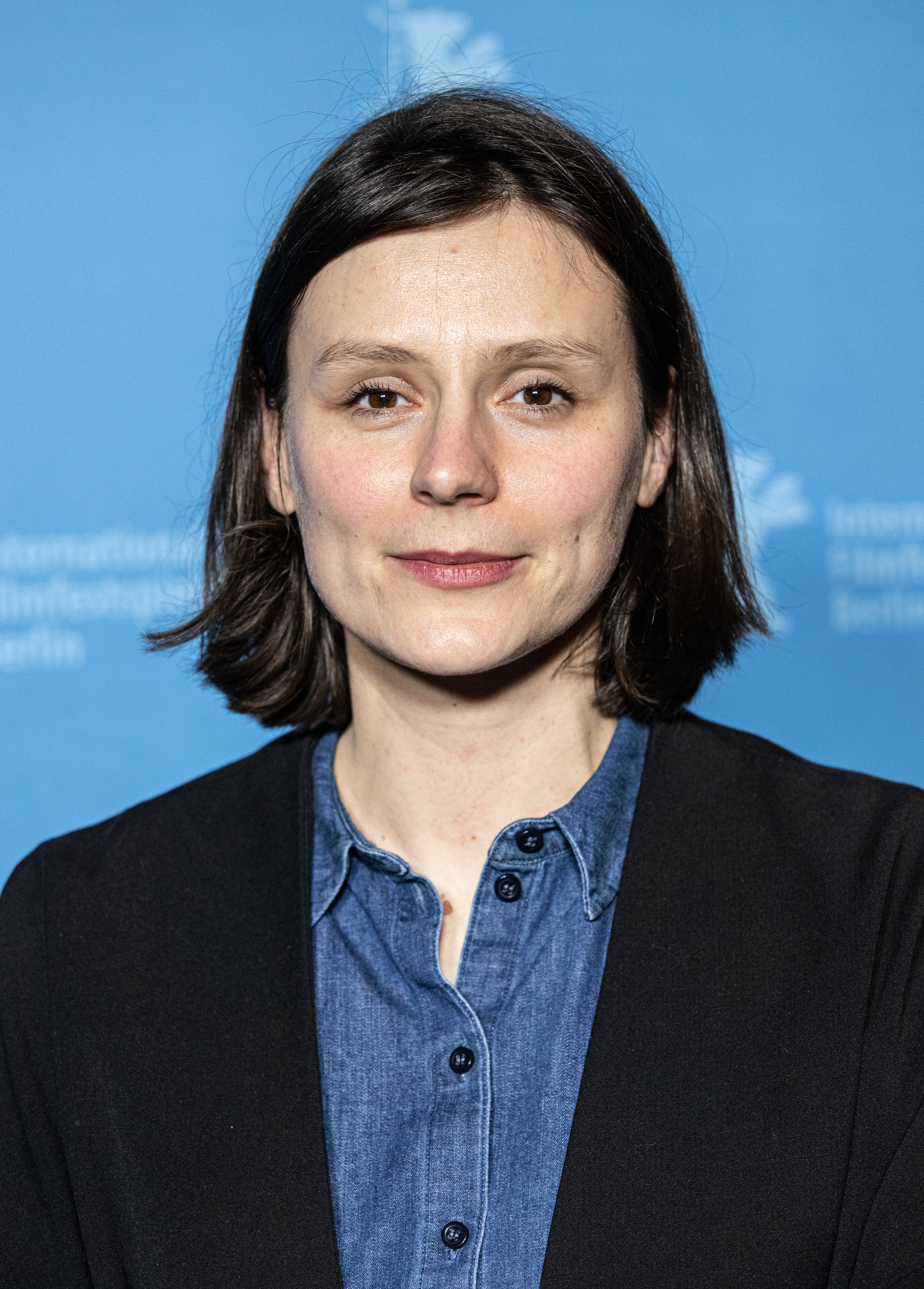
- 2026 winner: Sandra Wollner
- Date: 1978–present
- Country: France
- Presented by: Cannes Film Festival
- First award: 1998
- Currently held by: Sandra Wollner; Everytime (2026)
- Website: festival-cannes.com

Un Certain Regard (French: [œ̃ sɛʁtɛ̃ ʁəɡaʁ]; 'A Certain Glance') is a section of the Cannes Film Festival's official selection. It is run at the salle Debussy, parallel to the competition for the Palme d'Or.

The section usually presents 20 films from upcoming filmmakers and innovative work.

== History ==
The section was introduced by Gilles Jacob in 1978, initially as a non-competitive parallel section for upcoming and established filmmakers.

Since 1998, the section was turned into a parallel competition, awarding the Un Certain Regard Prize and collateral prizes, such as Best Actress or Best Director.

Kazakh filmmaker Darezhan Omirbaev was the first winner for Killer (1998), at the 51st Cannes Film Festival. Austrian filmmaker Sandra Wollner is the most recent winner for Everytime (2026), at the 79th Cannes Film Festival.

== Winners ==
The section official logo

In 1998, the Prix un certain regard was introduced to the section to recognize young talent and to encourage innovative and daring works by presenting one of the films with a grant to aid its distribution in France. Since 2005, the prize consists of €30,000 financed by the Groupama GAN Foundation.

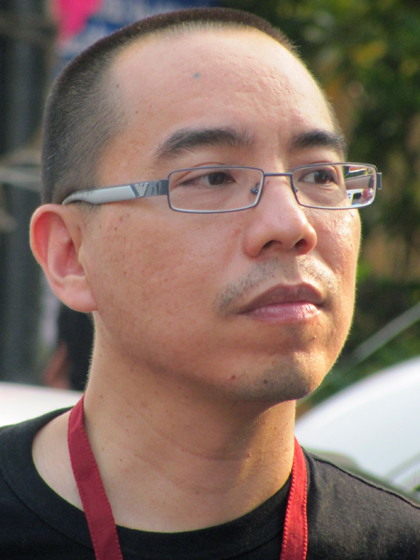
Apichatpong Weerasethakul won for Blissfully Yours (2002)

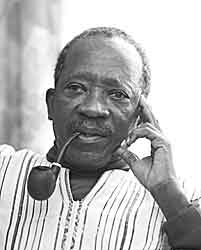
Ousmane Sembène won for Moolaadé (2004)

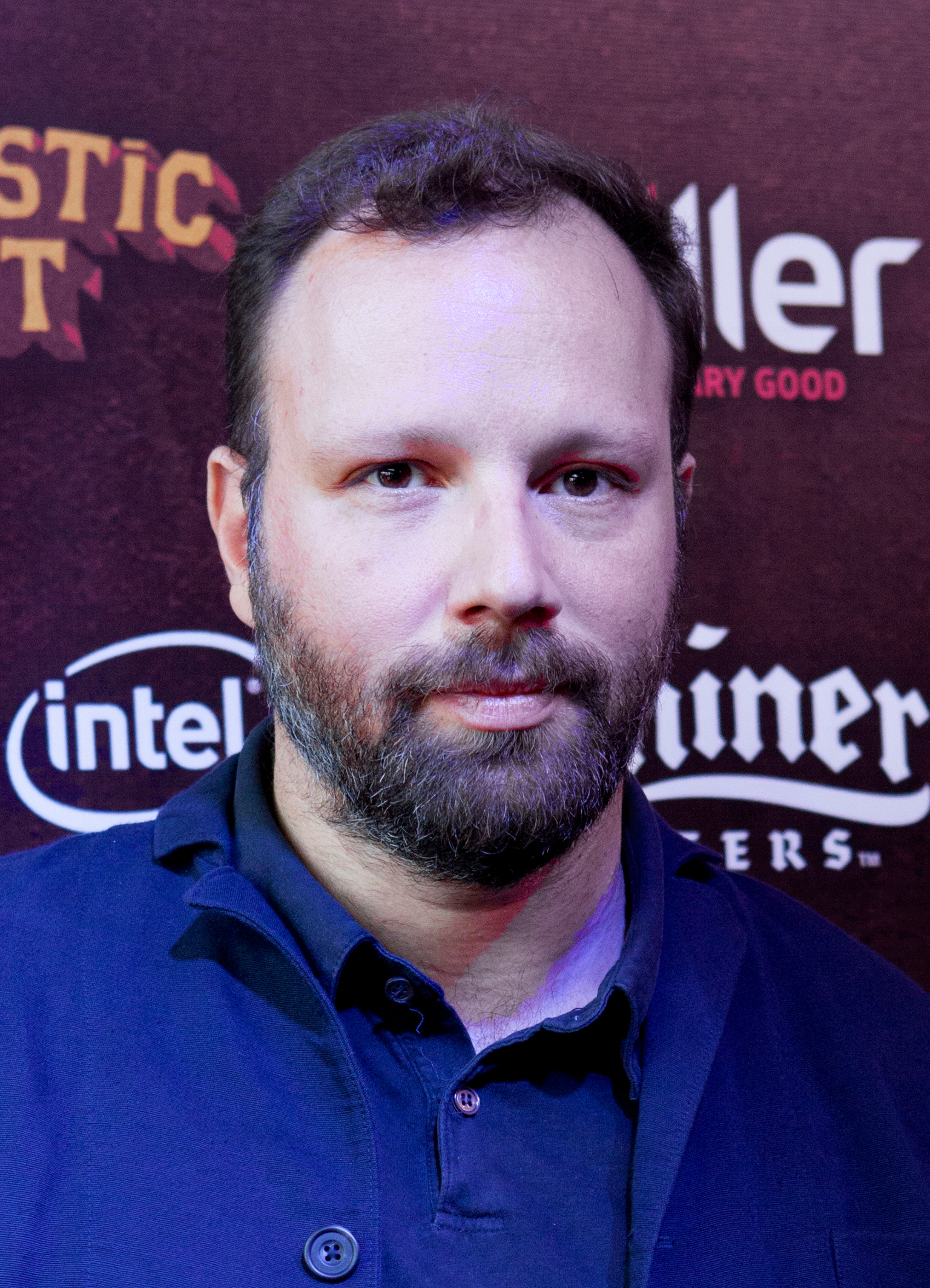
Yorgos Lanthimos won for Dogtooth (2009)

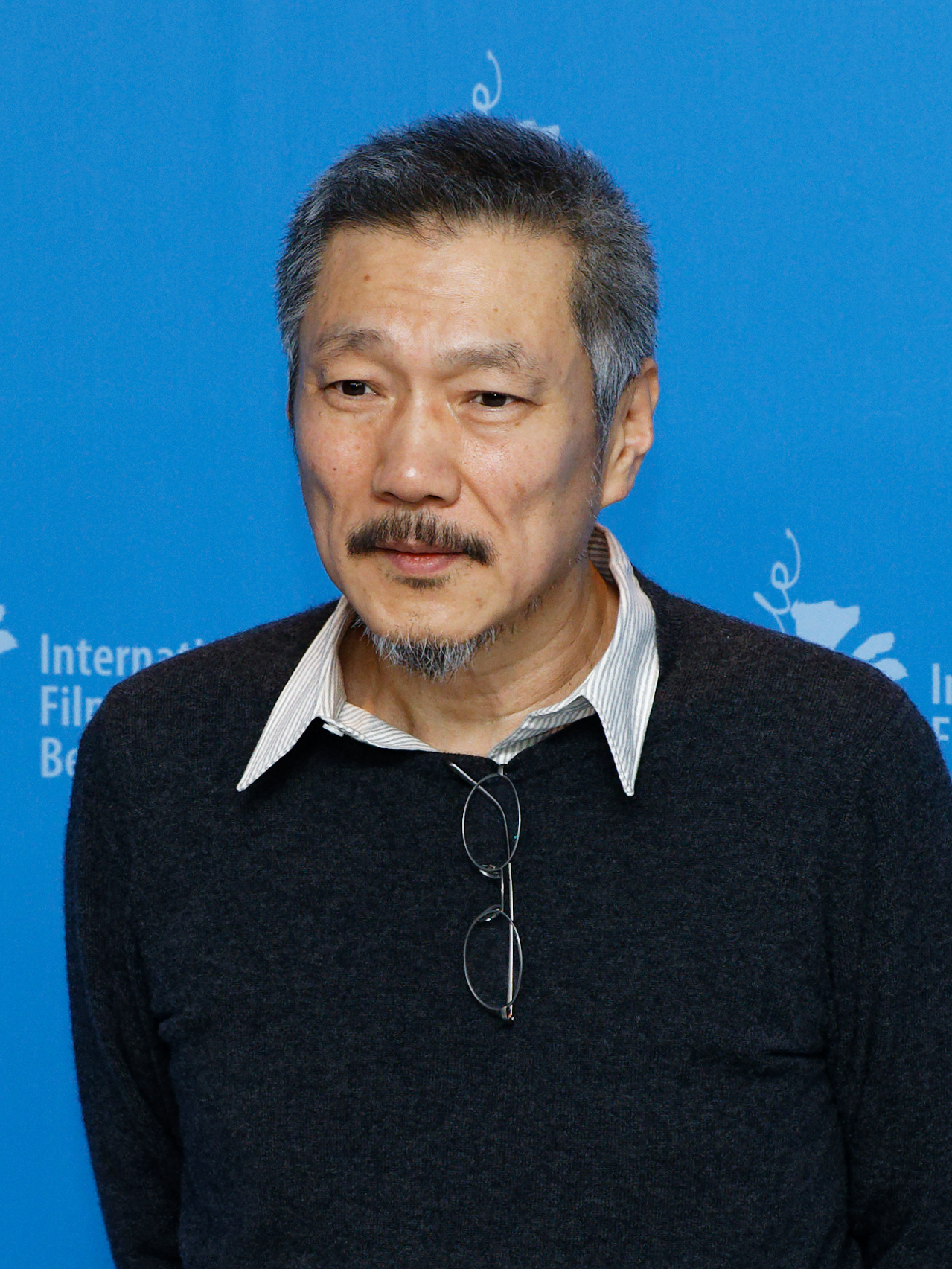
Hong Sang-soo won for Hahaha (2010)

Kornél Mundruczó won for White God (2014)

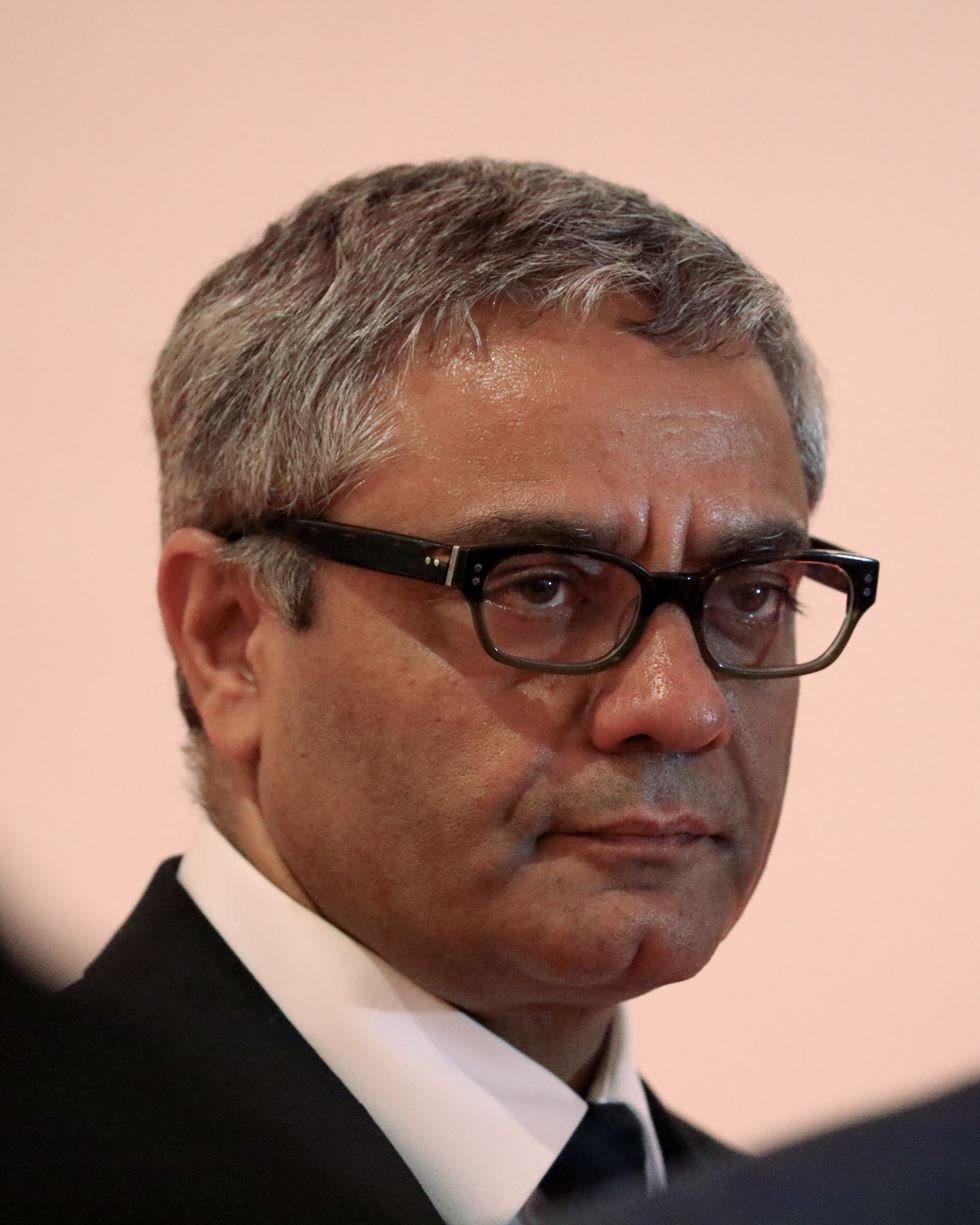
Mohammad Rasoulof won for A Man of Integrity (2017)

=== 1990s ===
Year	English title	Original title	Director(s)	Production country
1998	Killer	Tueur à gages	Darezhan Omirbaev	Kazakhstan, France
1999	Beautiful People		Jasmin Dizdar	United Kingdom, Bosnia and Herzegovina

=== 2000s ===
Year	English title	Original title	Director(s)	Production country
2000	Things You Can Tell Just by Looking at Her		Rodrigo García	United States
2001	Boyhood Loves	Amour d'enfance	Yves Caumon	France
2002	Blissfully Yours	สุดเสน่หา	Apichatpong Weerasethakul	Thailand
2003	The Best of Youth	La meglio gioventù	Marco Tullio Giordana	Italy
2004	Moolaadé		Ousmane Sembène	Senegal
2005	The Death of Mr. Lazarescu	Moartea domnului Lăzărescu	Cristi Puiu	Romania
2006	Luxury Car	江城夏日	Wang Chao	China, France
2007	California Dreamin'		Cristian Nemescu	Romania
2008	Tulpan		Sergey Dvortsevoy	Kazakhstan
2009	Dogtooth	Κυνόδοντας	Yorgos Lanthimos	Greece

=== 2010s ===
Year	English title	Original title	Director(s)	Production country
2010	Hahaha	하하하	Hong Sang-soo	South Korea
2011	Arirang	아리랑	Kim Ki-duk	South Korea
2011	Stopped on Track	Halt auf freier Strecke	Andreas Dresen	Germany
2012	After Lucia	Después de Lucía	Michel Franco	Mexico
2013	The Missing Picture	L'image manquante	Rithy Panh	Cambodia, France
2014	White God	Fehér isten	Kornél Mundruczó	Hungary, Germany, Sweden
2015	Rams	Hrútar	Grímur Hákonarson	Iceland, Denmark, Poland, Norway
2016	The Happiest Day in the Life of Olli Mäki	Hymyilevä mies	Juho Kuosmanen	Finland, Germany, Sweden
2017	A Man of Integrity	لِرد	Mohammad Rasoulof	Iran
2018	Border	Gräns	Ali Abbasi	Sweden
2019	The Invisible Life of Eurídice Gusmão	A Vida Invisível de Eurídice Gusmão	Karim Aïnouz	Brazil

=== 2020s ===
Year	English title	Original title	Director(s)	Production country
2021	Unclenching the Fists	Разжимая кулаки	Kira Kovalenko	Russia
2022	The Worst Ones	Les pires	Lise Akoka and Romane Gueret	France
2023	How to Have Sex		Molly Manning Walker	United Kingdom
2024	Black Dog	狗阵	Guan Hu	China
2025	The Mysterious Gaze of the Flamingo	La misteriosa mirada del flamenco	Diego Céspedes	Chile, France, Germany, Spain, Belgium
2026	Everytime		Sandra Wollner	Austria, Germany

== Other awards ==
=== 2000s ===
Year	Award	English title	Original title	Recipient
2000	Special Mention	Me You Them	Eu Tu Eles	Andrucha Waddington
2003	Jury Prize	Crimson Gold	طلای سرخ	Jafar Panahi
2003	Prix le premier regard	A Thousand Months	Mille mois	Faouzi Bensaïdi
2004	Prix du regard original	Whisky		Juan Pablo Rebella and Pablo Stoll
2004	Prix du regard vers l'avenir	Earth and Ashes	خاکستر و خاک	Atiq Rahimi
2005	Prix de l'intimité	Le filmeur		Alain Cavalier
2005	Prix de l'espoir	Delwende		Saint Pierre Yaméogo
2006	Best Actress	The Way I Spent the End of the World	Cum mi-am petrecut sfârșitul lumii	Dorotheea Petre
2006	Best Actor	The Violin	El violín	Ángel Tavira
2006	Special Jury Prize	Ten Canoes		Rolf de Heer
2006	Prix du président du jury	Murderers	Meurtrières	Patrick Grandperret
2007	Special Jury Prize	Actresses	Actrices	Valeria Bruni-Tedeschi
2007	Coup de cœur du jury	The Band's Visit	ביקור התזמורת	Eran Kolirin
2008	Jury Prize	Tokyo Sonata	トウキョウソナタ	Kiyoshi Kurosawa
2008	Coup de cœur du jury	Cloud 9	Wolke Neun	Andreas Dresen
2008	Le K.O. du certain regard	Tyson		James Toback
2008	Prix de l'espoir	Johnny Mad Dog		Jean-Stéphane Sauvaire
2009	Jury Prize	Police, Adjective	Polițist, adjectiv	Corneliu Porumboiu
2009	Special Jury Prize	No One Knows About Persian Cats	کسی از گربه های ایرانی خبر نداره	Bahman Ghobadi
2009	Special Jury Prize	Father of My Children	Le père de mes enfants	Mia Hansen-Løve

=== 2010s ===
Year	Award	English title	Original title	Recipient
2010	Jury Prize	October	Octubre	Daniel and Diego Vega
2010	Best Actress	The Lips	Los Labios	Adela Sánchez, Eva Bianco, Victoria Raposo
2011	Best Director	Goodbye	به امید دیدار	Mohammad Rasoulof
2011	Special Jury Prize	Elena	Елена	Andrey Zvyagintsev
2012	Best Actress	Laurence Anyways		Suzanne Clément
2012	Best Actress	Our Children	À Perdre la Raison	Émilie Dequenne
2012	Special Jury Prize	Le grand soir		Gustave Kervern and Benoît Delépine
2012	Special Mention	Children of Sarajevo	Djeca	Aida Begić
2013	Jury Prize	Omar	عمر	Hany Abu-Assad
2013	Best Director	Stranger by the Lake	L'Inconnu du lac	Alain Guiraudie
2013	Prix un talent certain pour l'ensemble des comédiens	The Golden Dream	La jaula de oro	Diego Quemada-Díez
2013	Prix de l'avenir	Fruitvale Station		Ryan Coogler
2014	Jury Prize	Force Majeure		Ruben Östlund
2014	Best Actor	Charlie's Country		David Gulpilil
2014	Prix d'ensemble	Party Girl		Marie Amachoukeli, Claire Burger and Samuel Theis
2014	Special Prize	The Salt of the Earth	Le sel de la terre	Wim Wenders and Juliano Ribeiro Salgado
2015	Jury Prize	The High Sun	Zvizdan	Dalibor Matanic
2015	Best Director	Journey to the Shore	岸辺の旅	Kiyoshi Kurosawa
2015	Prix avenir prometteur	The Fourth Direction	Chauthi Koot	Gurvinder Singh
2015	Prix avenir prometteur	Masaan		Neeraj Ghaywan
2015	Prix avenir prometteur	Nahid		Ida Panahandeh
2015	Prix un certain talent	The Treasure	Comoara	Corneliu Porumboiu
2016	Jury Prize	Harmonium	淵に立つ	Koji Fukada
2016	Best Director	Captain Fantastic		Matt Ross
2016	Best Screenplay	The Stopover	Voir du pays	Delphine and Muriel Coulin
2016	Special Prize	The Red Turtle	La Tortue rouge	Michaël Dudok de Wit
2017	Jury Prize	April's Daughter	Las Hijas de Abril	Michel Franco
2017	Best Actress	Fortunata		Jasmine Trinca
2017	Best Director	Wind River		Taylor Sheridan
2017	Prix de la poésie du cinéma	Barbara		Mathieu Amalric
2018	Jury Prize	The Dead and the Others	Chuva é Cantoria na Aldeia dos Mortos	João Salaviza and Renée Nader Messora
2018	Best Actor	Girl		Victor Polster
2018	Best Director	Donbass	Донбасс	Sergei Loznitsa
2018	Best Screenplay	Sofia		Meryem Benm'Barek-Aloïsi
2019	Jury Prize	Fire Will Come	O que arde	Oliver Laxe
2019	Best Actress	On a Magical Night	Chambre 212	Chiara Mastroianni
2019	Best Director	Beanpole	Дылда	Kantemir Balagov
2019	Coup de cœur	The Climb		Michael Angelo Covino
2019	Special Jury Prize	Liberté		Albert Serra

=== 2020s ===
Year	Award	English title	Original title	Recipient
2021	Jury Prize	Great Freedom	Große Freiheit	Sebastian Meise
2021	Ensemble Prize	Good Mother	Bonne Mère	Hafsia Herzi
2021	Prix de l'originalité	Lamb	Dýrið	Valdimar Jóhannsson
2021	Prix du Courage	La Civil		Teodora Mihai
2021	Special Mention	Prayers for the Stolen	Noche de fuego	Tatiana Huezo
2022	Jury Prize	Joyland	جوائے لینڈ	Saim Sadiq
2022	Best Director	Metronom		Alexandru Belc
2022	Best Performance	Corsage		Vicky Krieps
2022	Best Performance	Harka		Adam Bessa
2022	Best Screenplay	Mediterranean Fever	حمى البحر المتوسط	Maha Haj
2022	Coup de cœur	Rodeo		Lola Quivoron
2023	Jury Prize	Hounds	Les Meutes	Kamal Lazraq
2023	Best Director	The Mother of All Lies	كذب أبيض	Asmae El Moudir
2023	Freedom Prize	Goodbye Julia	وداعاً جوليا	Mohamed Kordofani
2023	Ensemble Prize	The Buriti Flower	Crowrã	João Salaviza, Renée Nader Messora, cast and crew
2023	New Voice Prize	Omen	Augure	Baloji
2024	Jury Prize	Souleymane's Story	L'histoire de Souleymane	Boris Lojkine
2024	Best Director	The Damned	I Dannati	Roberto Minervini
2024	Best Director	On Becoming a Guinea Fowl		Rungano Nyoni
2024	Best Performance	The Shameless		Anasuya Sengupta
2024	Best Performance	Souleymane's Story	L'histoire de Souleymane	Abou Sangaré
2024	Youth Prize	Holy Cow	Vingt Dieux	Louise Courvoisier
2024	Special Mention	Norah	نورة	Tawfik Alzaidi
2025	Jury Prize	A Poet	Un Poeta	Simón Mesa Soto
2025	Best Director	Once Upon a Time in Gaza		Tarzan and Arab Nasser
2025	Best Screenplay	Pillion		Harry Lighton
2025	Best Actor	Urchin		Frank Dillane
2025	Best Actress	I Only Rest in the Storm	O Riso e a Faca	Cleo Diára
2026	Jury Prize	Elephants in the Fog	तिनीहरू	Abinash Bikram Shah
2026	Best Actor	Congo Boy		Bradley Fiomona Dembeasset
2026	Best Actress	Forever Your Maternal Animal	Siempre soy tu animal materno	Daniela Marín Navarro, Marina de Tavira and Mariangel Villegas
2026	Special Jury Prize	Iron Boy	Le Corset	Louis Clichy
