= Spiros Stathoulopoulos =

Greek film director (born 1977)

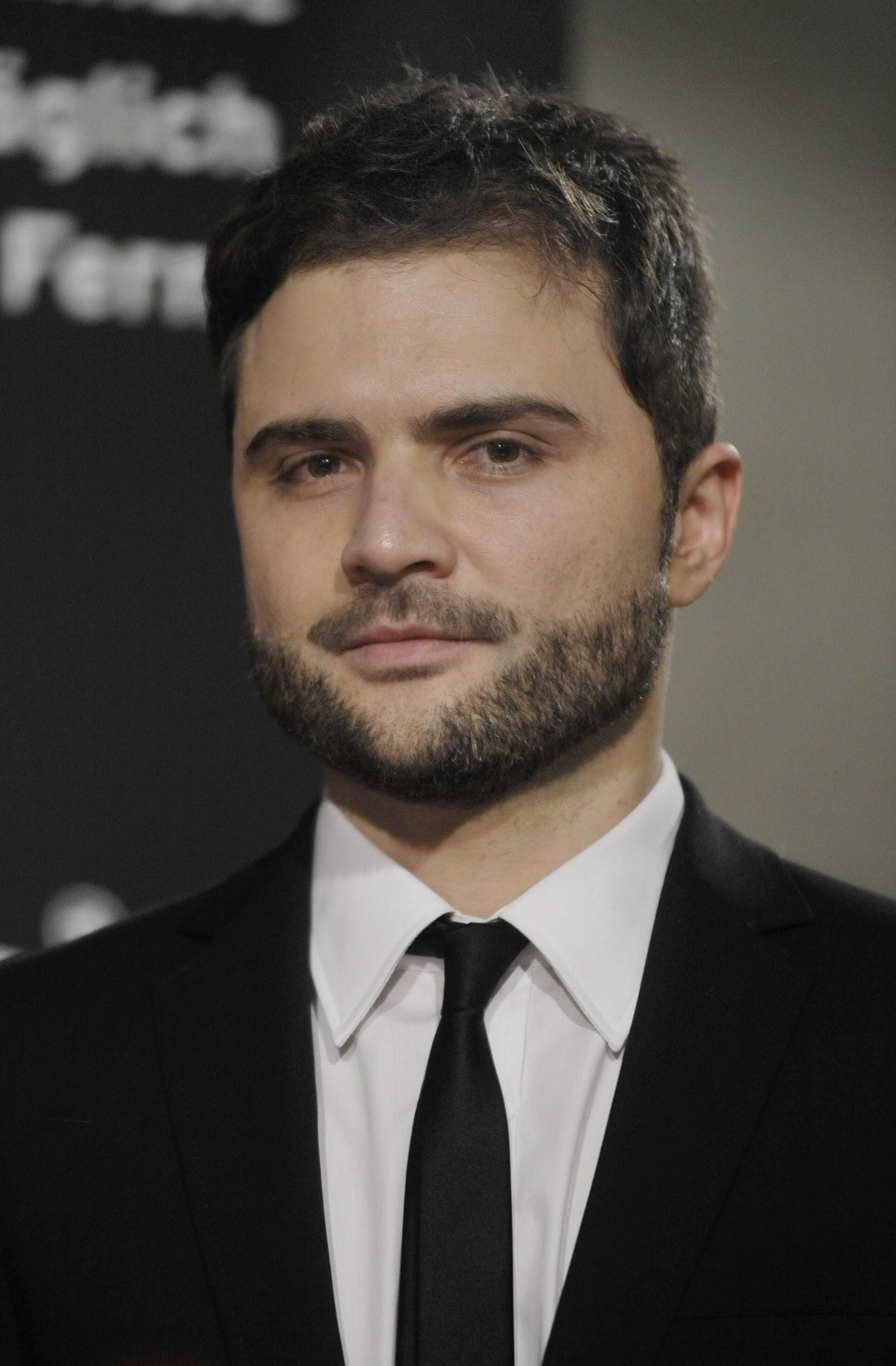
- Stathoulopoulos in 2020
- Born: 5 December 1978 (age 47)
- Education: California State University
- Occupations: Film Director, Screenwriter

Spiros Stathoulopoulos (Greek: Σπύρος Σταθουλόπουλος; born 1978) is a Greek-Colombian film director best known for the continuously shot thriller PVC-1 (2007) and Meteora (2012).

== Biography ==
Spiros Stathoulopoulos was born in Greece and moved to Colombia at the age of 8. Already at school he developed interest to cinema and at the age of 14 won and award for his short meter film Dimension. Stathoulopoulos studied film-making in Colombia, then at the California State University.

PVC-1 debuted at the 60th Cannes Film Festival in the Quinzaine des Réalisateurs and won numerous international awards including the FIPRESCI Prize at the Thessaloniki International Film Festival.

Meteora, his second film, was nominated for the Golden Bear at the 62nd Berlin International Film Festival.

His segment Killing Klaus Kinski (2016), from the Colombian omnibus film Amazonas, competed in the 2017 Clermont-Ferrand International Short Film Festival, as well as other international festivals in 2018 and 2019.

His next project (working title Godard Knows The Truth) was pitched at the Les Arcs Coproduction Village.

His next feature, Cavewoman, was released in 2022. A modern interpretation of Euripides's Electra, it starred Angeliki Papoulia as a protagonist, a female resistance fighter during the Nazi invasion of Greece. At the 63rd Thessaloniki International Film Festival it won the JF Costopoulos Foundation Award.
