= Arena (2009 film) =

2009 film

- Film poster
- Directed by: João Salaviza
- Written by: João Salaviza
- Produced by: François d'Artemare; Maria João Mayer
- Starring: Carloto Cotta
- Cinematography: Vasco Viana
- Edited by: João Salaviza
- Release dates: 26 April 2009 (IndieLisboa); 17 September 2009 (Portugal)
- Running time: 15 minutes
- Country: Portugal
- Language: Portuguese

Arena is a 2009 Portuguese short drama film directed by João Salaviza. It won the Short Film Palme d'Or at the 2009 Cannes Film Festival.

== Cast ==
- Carloto Cotta as Mauro
- Cláudio Rosa as 2nd kid
- Rafael Sardo as 1st kid
- Rodrigo Madeira as Alemão

== See also ==
- Portuguese films of the 2000s
