= The Buriti Flower =

2023 docudrama film by João Salaviza and Renée Nader Messora

- French theatrical release poster
- Portuguese: A Flor do Buriti
- Krahô: Crowrã
- Directed by: João Salaviza; Renée Nader Messora
- Written by: João Salaviza; Renée Nader Messora; Ilda Patpro Krahô; Francisco Hyjnõ Krahô; Henrique Ihjac Krahô
- Produced by: João Salaviza; Julia Alves; Renée Nader Messora; Ricardo Alves Jr
- Starring: Ilda Patpro Krahô; Francisco Hyjnõ Krahô; Solane Tehtikwyj Krahô; Raene Kôtô Krahô; Débora Sodré; Luzia Cruwakwyj Krahô
- Cinematography: Renée Nader Messora
- Edited by: João Salaviza; José Edgar Feldman; Renée Nader Messora
- Production companies: Karõ Filmes; Entrefilmes
- Distributed by: Embaúba Filmes (Brazil); Desforra Apache (Portugal)
- Release dates: 23 May 2023 (Cannes); 4 July 2024 (Brazil)
- Running time: 125 minutes
- Countries: Brazil; Portugal
- Languages: Krahô; Portuguese

The Buriti Flower (Portuguese: A Flor do Buriti / Krahô: Crowrã) is a 2023 docudrama film directed by João Salaviza and Renée Nader Messora. A co-production of Brazil and Portugal, it stars the local indigenous population as fictional accounts of themselves, and follows the Krahô indigenous community in the Brazilian Amazon rainforest, and their survival struggle against settlers.

The film had its world premiere in the Un Certain Regard section of the 2023 Cannes Film Festival on 23 May, where it won the section's Ensemble Prize. It was theatrically released in Brazil by Embaúba Filmes on 4 July 2024.

== Premise ==
The film spans 80 years of Krahô history, highlighting significant events—such as a 1940 massacre perpetrated by settlers—and their repercussions for subsequent generations.

== Cast ==
- Ilda Patpro Krahô
- Francisco Hyjnõ Krahô
- Solane Tehtikwyj Krahô
- Raene Kôtô Krahô
- Débora Sodré
- Luzia Cruwakwyj Krahô
- Sônia Guajajara

== Production ==
=== Development ===
It is João Salaviza and Renée Nader Messora second feature film about the Krahô indigenous community of the Amazônia Legal, following The Dead and the Others (2018), and also as part of the duo effort to capture the community struggle to survive. It includes a sequence based on the 1940s Krahô massacre, where 26 indigenous were murdered by settlers, an event that still affects how the community perceives the world. The Krahô estimated population by 2023 was 122, according to the SESAI (Secretaria de Saúde Indígena/Secretariat of Indigenous Health) and the Ministry of Health.

The screenplay was co-written by Salaviza and Messora alongside a trio of Krahô locals: Ilda Patpro Krahô, Francisco Hyjnõ Krahô, and Henrique Ihjac Krahô.

The title comes from the Mauritia flexuosa, popularly called Buriti in Brazil, and closely linked with the Amazon rainforest and its indigenous population.

=== Filming ===
Principal photography took place on location in four indigenous communities (mainly in Pedra Branca) of the Terra Indígena Kraolândia reservation in Tocantins during fifteen months. Co-director Renée Nader Messora was also the director of photography, shooting in 16mm film.

The Brazilian Minister of Indigenous Peoples, Sônia Guajajara, has a cameo as herself.

== Release ==
The film had its world premiere in the Un Certain Regard section of the 2023 Cannes Film Festival on 23 May, where it received a 10-minute standing ovation and won the section's Ensemble Prize for its cast and crew.

It was theatrically released in Brazil by Embaúba Filmes on 4 July 2024.
