= Meteora (film) =

2012 Greek drama film

- Film poster
- Directed by: Spiros Stathoulopoulos
- Written by: Asimakis Alfa Pagidas; Spiros Stathoulopoulos
- Starring: Theo Alexander
- Cinematography: Spiros Stathoulopoulos
- Release date: 12 February 2012 (Berlin)
- Running time: 82 minutes
- Country: Greece
- Language: Greek

Meteora (Greek: Μετέωρα) is a 2012 Greek drama film directed by Spiros Stathoulopoulos. It competed at the 62nd Berlin International Film Festival in February 2012. The film takes its title from the Byzantine monastery complex Metéora, in Thessaly, a series of structures built on natural sandstone pillars whose tops often disappear into the clouds.

== Plot ==
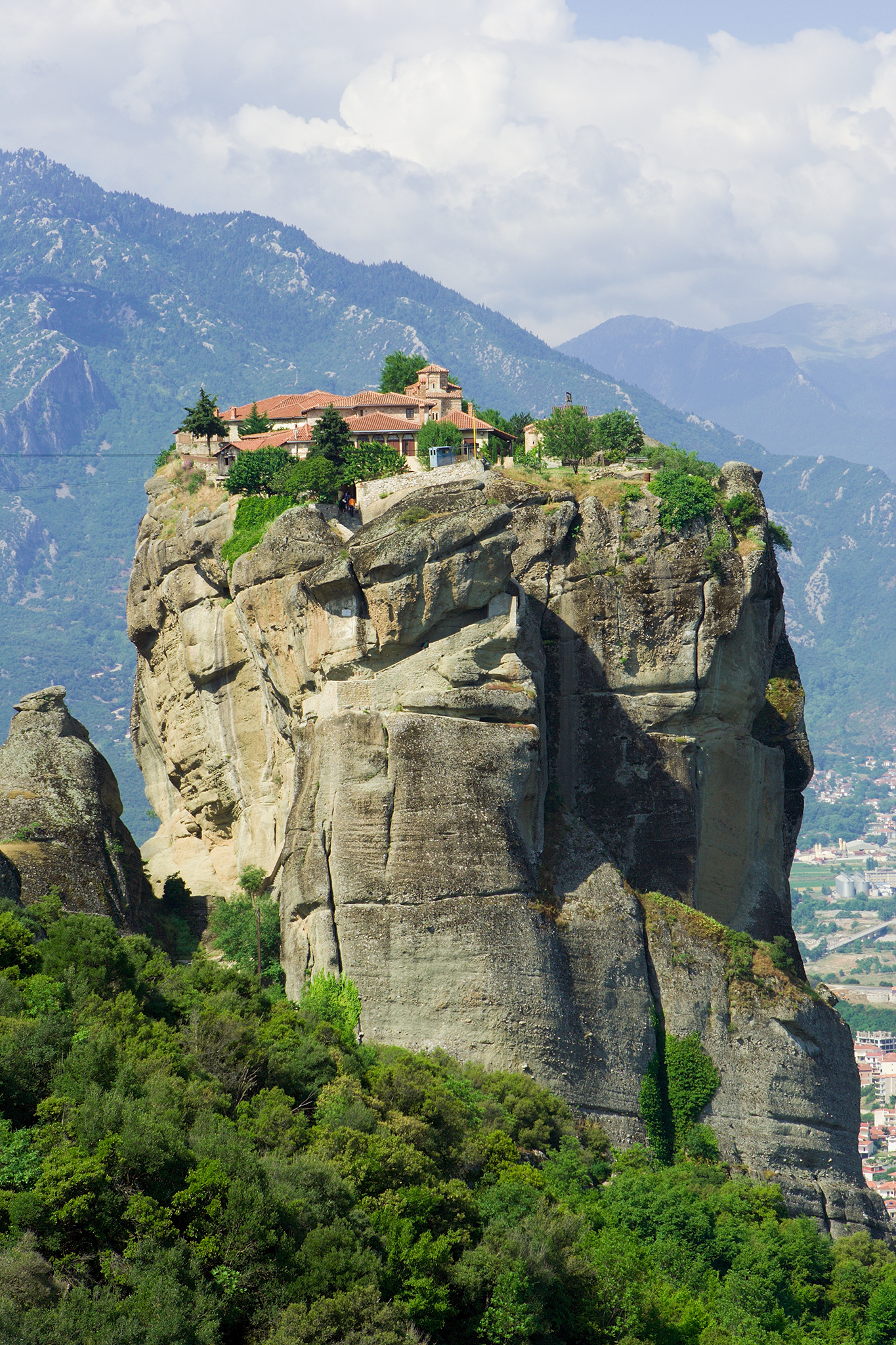
The monastery at Meteora

All action takes place at, or near, the Monastery of the Holy Trinity, Meteora. A young Greek monk falls in love with a Russian nun. The story looks at the struggle between religious devotion, temptations of the flesh, the yearning of the human heart, and the role of the individual within the community of believers. The two communicate with each other across the valley using mirrors to flash a morse code signal, with lights dancing on the wall of her cell in the Agios Stefano Convent, also set on a rock pinnacle.

The film is set in Central Greece, where medieval monasteries perch on the apex of hugely dramatic sandstone pinnacles, and the main access is to be hauled up in a net tied to a rope. A steep set of steps also access from one side. Views are breath-taking, and often in extreme long-shot, with human figures appearing as small black dots on the screen.

The monks and nuns obey the rituals of the Greek Orthodox Church in this austere environment, remote from modern human life in every sense with the strong rhythm of prayer and asceticism.

Basic food (bread and milk) is delivered to the monks by the nuns, and winched up using the same net and rope system used for the monks themselves. There is no electricity, and lighting is by means of oil lamps. Music in the monastery is limited to rhythmic hammering on a suspended wooden board and a few bells.

The film is interspersed with animation, based on ancient Greek icons.

"Meteora" means "lifted into heights" or "afloat", as is the case of the two lovers whose emotions are in such a state - in limbo between their belief and their desire.

== Cast ==
- Theo Alexander as Brother Georgi
- Tamila Koulieva as the nun with the injured hand
- Adonis Kapsalis as Brother
