= Our Beloved Month of August =

- Directed by: Miguel Gomes
- Produced by: Sandro Aguilar; Luís Urbano
- Starring: Sónia Bandeira; Fábio Oliveira
- Cinematography: Rui Poças
- Release date: 21 August 2008
- Running time: 147 minutes
- Country: Portugal
- Language: Portuguese
- Box office: €89,274.66

Our Beloved Month of August (Portuguese: Aquele Querido Mês de Agosto) is a 2008 Portuguese film directed by Miguel Gomes.

== Reception ==
As of 31 October 2008, the film has grossed more than €89,000. It won the Critics Award at the 2008 São Paulo International Film Festival. At the 2008 Valdivia International Film Festival it also won the Critics Award and the award for Best Film. It was the Portuguese submission for the Academy Award for Best Foreign Language Film in the 81st Academy Awards.
