= 62nd Berlin International Film Festival =

2012 film festival in Berlin, Germany

- Festival poster
- Opening film: Les adieux à la reine
- Closing film: Caesar Must Die
- Location: Berlin, Germany
- Founded: 1951
- Awards: Golden Bear: Caesar Must Die
- Hosted by: Anke Engelke
- No. of films: 395 films
- Festival date: 9–19 February 2012
- Website: berlinale.de

Berlin International Film Festival chronology
- 63rd 61st

The 62nd annual Berlin International Film Festival was held from 9 to 19 February 2012. British film director Mike Leigh was the president of the jury. The first five films to be screened in the competition were announced on 19 December 2011. American actress Meryl Streep was presented with the Honorary Golden Bear on 14 February. Benoît Jacquot's film Farewell, My Queen was announced as the opening film.

The Golden Bear went to the Italian film Caesar Must Die, directed by Paolo and Vittorio Taviani, which also served as closing night film.

== Juries ==
The following people were announced as being on the jury for the festival:

=== Main Competition ===
- Mike Leigh, British filmmaker - Jury President
- Anton Corbijn, Dutch photographer and director
- Asghar Farhadi, Iranian filmmaker and producer
- Charlotte Gainsbourg, French actress
- Jake Gyllenhaal, American actor
- François Ozon, French filmmaker
- Boualem Sansal, Algerian writer
- Barbara Sukowa, German actress

=== Best First Feature Award ===
- Matthew Modine, American actor
- Hania Mroué, Lebanese producer and distributor
- Moritz Rinke, German journalist and writer

=== Short Film Competition ===
- Sandra Hüller, German actress
- Emily Jacir, Palestine artist and producer
- David O'Reilly, Irish director, screenwriter and producer

== Official Sections ==
=== In competition ===
The following films were in competition for the Golden Bear and Silver Bear awards:

| English title | Original title | Director(s) | Production Country |
|---|---|---|---|
| Today | Aujourd'hui | Alain Gomis | France, Senegal |
| Barbara | | Christian Petzold | Germany |
| Caesar Must Die | Cesare deve morire | Paolo Taviani, Vittorio Taviani | Italy |
| Captive | | Brillante Mendoza | Philippines, France, Germany, United Kingdom |
| Childish Games | Dictado | Antonio Chavarrías | Spain |
| Coming Home | À moi seule | Frédéric Videau | France |
| Farewell, My Queen | Les adieux à la reine | Benoît Jacquot | France, Spain |
| Home for the Weekend | Was bleibt | Hans-Christian Schmid | Germany |
| Jayne Mansfield's Car | | Billy Bob Thornton | Russia, United States |
| Just the Wind | Csak a szél | Benedek Fliegauf | Hungary, Germany, France |
| Mercy | Gnade | Matthias Glasner | Germany, Norway |
| Meteora | Metéora | Spiros Stathoulopoulos | Germany, Greece |
| Postcards from the Zoo | Kebun binatang | Edwin | Indonesia, Germany |
| A Royal Affair | En kongelig affære | Nikolaj Arcel | Denmark, Czech Republic, Germany, Sweden |
| Sister | L'enfant d'en haut | Ursula Meier | Switzerland, France |
| Tabu | | Miguel Gomes | Portugal, Germany, Brazil, France |
| War Witch | Rebelle | Kim Nguyen | Canada |
| White Deer Plain | 白鹿原 | Wang Quan'an | China |

=== Out of competition ===
| English title | Original title | Director(s) | Country |
|---|---|---|---|
| Bel Ami | —N/a | Declan Donnellan, Nick Ormerod | United Kingdom |
| Extremely Loud and Incredibly Close | —N/a | Stephen Daldry | United States |
| The Flowers of War | 金陵十三钗 | Zhang Yimou | China |
| Flying Swords of Dragon Gate | —N/a | Tsui Hark | Hong Kong, China |
| Shadow Dancer | —N/a | James Marsh | United Kingdom, Ireland |
| Young Adult | —N/a | Jason Reitman | United States |

=== Panorama ===
| English title | Original title | Director(s) | Country |
|---|---|---|---|
| 10+10 | —N/a | Hou Hsiao-hsien, Wang Toon, Wu Nien-jen, Sylvia Chang, Chen Kuo-fu, Wei Te-sheng, Chung Meng-hung, Chang Tso-chi, Arvin Chen, Yang Ya-che | Taiwan |
| Calm at Sea | La mer à l'aube | Volker Schlöndorff | France, Germany |
| Death for Sale | —N/a | Faouzi Bensaïdi | France |
| Dollhouse | —N/a | Kirsten Sheridan | Ireland |
| Elles | —N/a | Małgorzata Szumowska | France, Poland, Germany |
| From Seoul to Varanasi | 불륜의 시대 | Jeon Kyu-hwan | South Korea |
| Headshot | ฝนตกขึ้นฟ้า | Pen-Ek Ratanaruang | Thailand, France |
| Indignados | —N/a | Tony Gatlif | France |
| Iron Sky | —N/a | Timo Vuorensola | Finland, Germany, Australia |
| Keep the Lights On | —N/a | Ira Sachs | United States |
| Kuma | —N/a | Umut Dag | Austria |
| Leave It on the Floor | —N/a | Sheldon Larry | United States, Canada |
| L'âge atomique | —N/a | Héléna Klotz | France |
| Lost in Paradise | Hotboy nổi loạn và câu chuyện về thằng Cười, cô gái điếm và con vịt | Vũ Ngọc Đãng | Viet Nam |
| Love | | Doze Niu | Taiwan |
| Mommy Is Coming | —N/a | Cheryl Dunye | Germany |
| My Brother the Devil | —N/a | Sally El Hosaini | United Kingdom |
| My Way | Mai-wei | Kang Je-gyu | South Korea |
| The Parade | Parada | Srđan Dragojević | Serbia, Croatia, Macedonia, Slovenia |
| The Wall | Die Wand | Julian Roman Pölsler | Austria, Germany |
| Wilaya | —N/a | Pedro Pérez Rosado | Spain |
| The Woman Who Brushed Off Her Tears | —N/a | Teona Strugar Mitevska | Macedonia, Germany, Slovenia, Belgium |
| Xingu | —N/a | Cao Hamburger | Brazil |

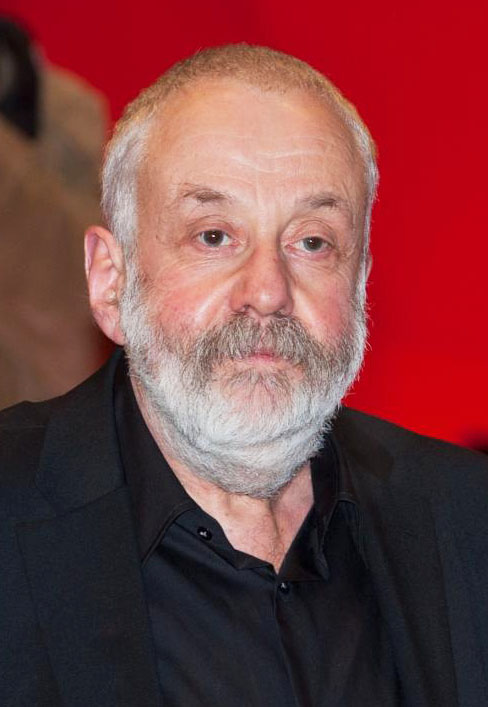
Mike Leigh, Jury President

== Official Awards ==
=== Main Competition ===
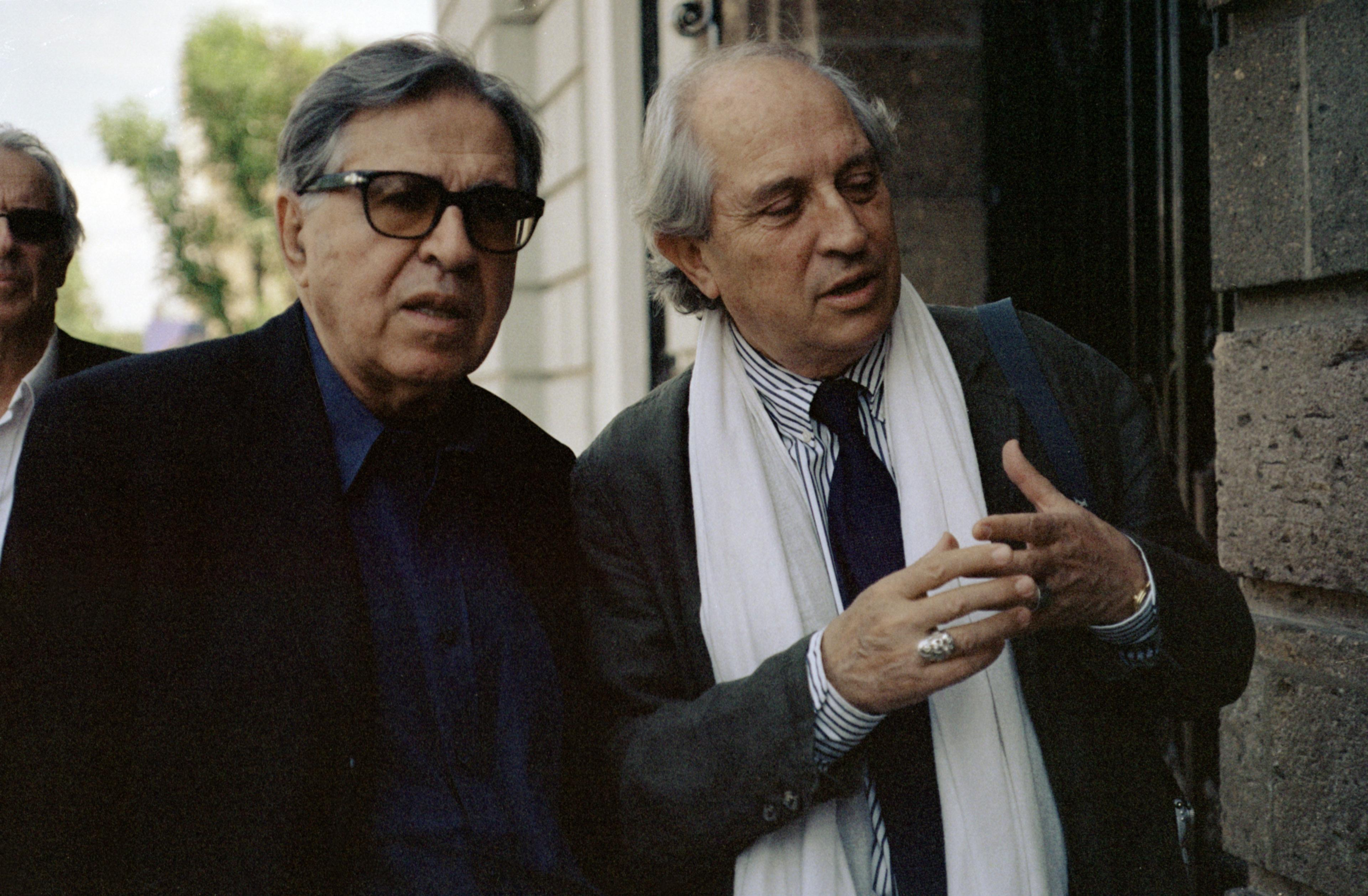
Paolo and Vittorio Taviani, winners of the Golden Bear at the festival

The following prizes were awarded by the International Jury: The Hollywood Reporter described the outcome as "a major upset". Der Spiegel said it was a "very conservative selection." Der Tagesspiegel criticised the outcome, "The jury shunned almost all the contemporary films that were admired or hotly debated at an otherwise pretty remarkable festival." Paolo Taviani said "We hope that when the film is released to the general public that cinemagoers will say to themselves or even those around them... that even a prisoner with a dreadful sentence, even a life sentence, is and remains a human being". Vittorio Taviani read out the names of the cast.

- Golden Bear: Caesar Must Die by Paolo and Vittorio Taviani
- Silver Bear Grand Jury Prize: Just the Wind by Benedek Fliegauf
- Silver Bear for Best Director: Christian Petzold for Barbara
- Silver Bear for Best Actress: Rachel Mwanza for War Witch
- Silver Bear for Best Actor: Mikkel Boe Følsgaard for A Royal Affair
- Silver Bear for Outstanding Artistic Contribution: Lutz Reitemeier for White Deer Plain (cinematography)
- Silver Bear for Best Screenplay: Nikolaj Arcel and Rasmus Heisterberg for A Royal Affair
- Alfred Bauer Prize: Tabu by Miguel Gomes
- Special Award – Silver Bear: Sister by Ursula Meier

=== Honorary Golden Bear ===
- Meryl Streep

=== Crystal Bears ===
- Generation Kplus (Feature Length Film): Arcadia by Olivia Silver
- Generation 14plus (Feature Length Film): Night of Silence by Reis Çelik

=== FIPRESCI Prizes ===
- Competition: Tabu by Miguel Gomes
- Panorama: Atomic Age by Héléna Klotz
- Forum: Hemel by Sacha Polak

=== Golden Bear for Best Short Film ===
- Rafa by João Salaviza
