= The Dead and the Others =

2018 film by João Salaviza and Renée Nader Messora

- Brazilian theatrical release poster
- Portuguese: Chuva é Cantoria na Aldeia dos Mortos
- Literally: Rain is Singing in the Village of the Dead
- Directed by: João Salaviza; Renée Nader Messora
- Written by: João Salaviza; Renée Nader Messora
- Produced by: João Salaviza; Renée Nader Messora; Ricardo Alves Jr; Thiago Macêdo Correia
- Starring: Henrique Ihjãc Krahô; Raene Kôtô Krahô; Douglas Tiepre Krahô; Iasmin Kropej Krahô; Osmar Kwycaké Krahô
- Cinematography: Renée Nader Messora
- Edited by: Ricardo Alves Jr.; Thiago Macêdo Correia; José Edgar Feldman; Renée Nader Messora; João Salaviza
- Production companies: Karõ Filmes; Entrefilmes; Material Bruto
- Distributed by: Embauba Filmes (Brazil); Desforra Apache (Portugal)
- Release dates: 16 May 2018 (Cannes); 18 April 2019 (Brazil)
- Running time: 114 minutes
- Countries: Brazil; Portugal
- Languages: Krahô; Portuguese

The Dead and the Others (Portuguese: Chuva é Cantoria na Aldeia dos Mortos, lit. 'Rain is Singing in the Village of the Dead') is a 2018 docudrama film written and directed by João Salaviza and Renée Nader Messora. A co-production of Brazil and Portugal, it stars the local indigenous population as fictional accounts of themselves, and follows the conflict of traditions between the Krahô indigenous heritage and the contemporary Brazilian society.

The film had its world premiere in the Un Certain Regard section of the 2018 Cannes Film Festival on 16 May, where it won the section's Jury Prize. It was theatrically released in Brazil by Embauba Filmes on 18 April 2019.

== Premise ==
Ihjãc, a young man from the Krahô ethnic group, refuses to become a shaman following his father’s death, and flees to the city. Far from his people and his own culture, Ihjãc faces the challenges of being an Indigenous person in contemporary Brazil.

== Cast ==
- Henrique Ihjãc Krahô as Ihjãc
- Raene Kôtô Krahô as Kôtô
- Douglas Tiepre Krahô
- Iasmin Kropej Krahô
- Osmar Kwycaké Krahô

== Production ==
Principal photography took place during nine months, starring the local Krahô indigenous population as fictional accounts of themselves.
