= Lines of Wellington =

2012 film

- Directed by: Valeria Sarmiento
- Written by: Carlos Saboga
- Produced by: Paulo Branco
- Starring: Nuno Lopes; Soraia Chaves; Marisa Paredes; John Malkovich; Carloto Cotta
- Cinematography: André Szankowski
- Edited by: Valeria Sarmiento; Luca Alverdi
- Music by: Jorge Arriagada
- Production company: Alfama Films
- Release dates: 4 September 2012 (Venice Film Festival); 4 October 2012 (Portugal)
- Running time: 151 minutes
- Countries: Portugal; France
- Languages: Portuguese; French; English

Lines of Wellington (Portuguese: Linhas de Wellington) is a 2012 Franco-Portuguese epic war film and television series prepared by Chilean director Raúl Ruiz and completed by his widow Valeria Sarmiento. Its title refers to the historical Lines of Torres Vedras.

The film was in competition for the Golden Lion at the 69th Venice International Film Festival. It was also shown at the 2012 San Sebastián International Film Festival, the 2012 Toronto International Film Festival and the 2012 New York Film Festival. The film was selected as the Portuguese entry for the Best Foreign Language Film at the 86th Academy Awards, but it was not nominated.

== Plot ==
In the autumn of 1810, the French forces of Marshal Masséna are invading Portugal and are temporarily halted by the Anglo-Portuguese army under Viscount Wellington at the Battle of Bussaco. As a bitter winter approaches, Wellington withdraws his troops towards the fortifications he has prepared in secret at the Lines of Torres Vedras. Using a scorched earth defence, he forces the inhabitants to evacuate the land in front of the Lines and destroys all supplies which could be useful to the French. The film illustrates these dramatic events by a series of vignettes which show the effects on combatants, both regular soldiers and guerrillas, and on the civilian population.

== Cast ==
- John Malkovich as General Wellington
- Soraia Chaves as Martírio
- Vincent Pérez as Lévêque
- Marisa Paredes as Dona Filipa
- Melvil Poupaud as Marshal Massena
- Mathieu Amalric as General Marbot
- Elsa Zylberstein as Sister Irmã Cordélia
- Christian Vadim as Marshal Soult
- Ricardo Pereira
- Carloto Cotta as Pedro de Alencar
- Nuno Lopes as Francisco Xavier
- Jemima West as Maureen
- Catherine Deneuve as Severina
- Isabelle Huppert as Cosima Pia
- Malik Zidi as Octave Ségur
- Chiara Mastroianni as Hussardo
- Michel Piccoli as Leópold Scheitzer
- Victoria Guerra as Clarissa
- Maria João Bastos as Maria de Jesus
- Marcello Urgeghe as Jonathan Foster
- José Afonso Pimentel as Zé Maria

== Reception ==
Jaime N. Christley of Slant Magazine wrote "Dull but never dreary, Lines of Wellington was one of the projects in Raúl Ruiz's pipeline before he passed away last year".

According to Xan Brooks of The Guardian "This epic historical pageant 'conceived by' the late director Raoul Ruiz won't win the top prize in Venice, but it's full of life"

== See also ==
- List of submissions to the 86th Academy Awards for Best Foreign Language Film
- List of Portuguese submissions for the Academy Award for Best Foreign Language Film
