= Banzo (film) =

2024 Portuguese drama film

- Theatrical release poster
- Directed by: Margarida Cardoso
- Written by: Margarida Cardoso
- Produced by: Filipa Reis; Yohann Cornu; François d'Artemare
- Starring: Carloto Cotta; Hoji Fortuna
- Cinematography: Leandro Ferrão
- Edited by: Pedro Filipe Marques
- Music by: Rutger Zuydervelt
- Production companies: Uma Pedra no Sapato; Filipa Reis; Les Films de L'après-midi; Damned Films; Baldr Film
- Distributed by: Uma Pedra no Sapato
- Release dates: 28 May 2024 (IndieLisboa); 23 January 2025 (Portugal)
- Running time: 127 minutes
- Countries: Portugal; Netherlands; France
- Language: Portuguese
- Box office: US$9,788

Banzo is a 2024 Portuguese-language drama film written and directed by Margarida Cardoso. Starring Carloto Cotta as Dr. Alfonso Paivaand and Hoji Fortuna as Alphonse, the film presents the legacy of Portuguese colonialism in Africa, revisiting memories and historical scars.

It premiered in National Competition at the IndieLisboa International Independent Film Festival on 28 May 2024, where it won Universities Culturgest Award for the Best Portuguese Feature Film and Árvore da Vida Award (Tree of Life Award).

It was selected as the Portuguese entry for the Best International Feature Film at the 98th Academy Awards, but it was not nominated.

== Synopsis ==
Set in 1907, the film follows Afonso, a doctor who arrives on a tropical African island to begin a new chapter as a plantation physician. Tasked with treating a group of servants afflicted by Banzo (melancholy)—a profound melancholy rooted in the legacy of slavery, he witnesses the devastating toll of the condition, as many succumb to starvation or suicide. In an effort to contain the illness, the servants are relocated to a remote, rain-soaked hillside surrounded by forest. Despite Afonso's medical efforts, his inability to grasp the emotional and spiritual depth of their suffering renders his treatments ineffective.

== Cast ==
- Carloto Cotta as Dr. Alfonso Paiva
- Hoji Fortuna as Alphonse
- João Pedro Bénard as Dr. Figueira
- Gonçalo Waddington as Raimundo
- Sara Carinhas as Luísa
- Ruben Simões as Ismael
- Maria Do Céu Ribeiro as Adelia
- Matamba Joaquim as Maianço
- Romeu Runa as Augusto
- Cirila Bossuet as Guilhermina

== Production ==
In June 2021, Eurimages decided to support the film with €250,000.

The film set in 1907 was filmed in Portuguese São Tomé and Príncipe.

== Release ==
Banzo had its world premiere at IndieLisboa International Independent Film Festival on 28 May 2024. It competed for Crystal Globe with other eleven feature films at the 58th Karlovy Vary International Film Festival on 4 July 2024.

The film selected in Official Selection at the Seville European Film Festival was screened in November 2024.

It was released in French theaters on 25 December 2024.

== Reception ==
On the AlloCiné, which lists 5 press reviews, the film obtained an average rating of 3.6/5.

== Accolades ==
Year	Award	Category	Recipient(s)	Result	Ref
2024	IndieLisboa International Independent Film Festival	Universities Culturgest Award	Banzo	Won	
2024	IndieLisboa International Independent Film Festival	Árvore da Vida Award	Banzo	Won	
2024	IndieLisboa International Independent Film Festival	Grand Prize City of Lisbon	Banzo	Nominated	
2024	Karlovy Vary International Film Festival	Crystal Globe Grand Prix	Banzo	Nominated	
2024	Camerimage	Golden Frog	Banzo	Nominated	
2024	Caminhos do Cinema Português	Best Screenplay	Margarida Cardoso	Won	
2025	Prémios AIP Cinema Awards	Best Cinematography in a Feature Film	Leandro Ferrão	Won	
2025	Golden Globes (Portugal)	Best Film	Banzo	Won	
2026	Sophia Awards (Portuguese Cinema Academy)	Best Original Screenplay	Margarida Cardoso	Won	
2026	Sophia Awards (Portuguese Cinema Academy)	Best Secondary Actor	Gonçalo Waddington	Nominated	
2026	Sophia Awards (Portuguese Cinema Academy)	Best Main Actor	Hoji Fortuna	Nominated	
2026	Sophia Awards (Portuguese Cinema Academy)	Best Secondary Actress	Cirila Bossuet	Won	
2026	Sophia Awards (Portuguese Cinema Academy)	Best Original Score	Banzo, Rutger Zuydervelt	Won	
2026	Sophia Awards (Portuguese Cinema Academy)	Best Art Direction	Banzo, Artur Pinheiro	Won	
2026	Sophia Awards (Portuguese Cinema Academy)	Best Photography Direction	Banzo, Leandro Ferrão	Won	
2026	Sophia Awards (Portuguese Cinema Academy)	Best Special Effects	Banzo, Arnaud Chelet, Filipe Pereira	Won	
2026	Sophia Awards (Portuguese Cinema Academy)	Best Wardrobe	Banzo, Sílvia Grabowski	Nominated	
2026	Sophia Awards (Portuguese Cinema Academy)	Best Film	Banzo	Won	
2026	Sophia Awards (Portuguese Cinema Academy)	Best Makeup, Characterization and Hair	Banzo	Nominated	
2026	Sophia Awards (Portuguese Cinema Academy)	Best Editing	Banzo	Won	
2026	Sophia Awards (Portuguese Cinema Academy)	Best Directing	Banzo, Margarida Cardoso	Won	
2026	Sophia Awards (Portuguese Cinema Academy)	Best Sound	Banzo	Won	

== See also ==
- List of submissions to the 98th Academy Awards for Best International Feature Film
- List of Portuguese submissions for the Academy Award for Best International Feature Film
