= Tabu (2012 film) =

2012 film

- Film poster
- Directed by: Miguel Gomes
- Written by: Miguel Gomes; Mariana Ricardo
- Produced by: Sandro Aguilar; Luís Urbano
- Starring: Teresa Madruga
- Cinematography: Rui Poças
- Edited by: Telmo Churro; Miguel Gomes
- Production companies: O Som e a Fúria; Komplizen Film; Gullane; Shellac Sud
- Release dates: 14 February 2012 (Berlin); 5 April 2012 (Portugal)
- Running time: 118 minutes
- Countries: Portugal; Germany; Brazil; France
- Language: Portuguese
- Box office: $1.1 million

Tabu is a 2012 Portuguese drama film co-written and directed by Miguel Gomes. It stars Teresa Madruga, Laura Soveral, Ana Moreira and Carloto Cotta. The first part of Tabu's plot depicts a socially conscious woman and the final days of her neighbour, an elderly woman named Aurora. The second is a flashback to a year in Aurora's life in 1960s Portuguese Africa. The film's title references F. W. Murnau's 1931 silent film.

Tabu premiered on 14 February 2012 at the 62nd Berlin International Film Festival, where it won the Alfred Bauer Award and the International Federation of Film Critics (FIPRESCI) prize. It won the Grand Prix at the 2012 edition of Film Fest Gent. Critically acclaimed, Tabu has been ranked among the best films of the year and the decade.

== Plot ==
Prologue

A narrator, Miguel Gomes himself, reads in voiceover a poetic and philosophical text that invokes a legend in which the Creator orders, but the heart commands: the suicide of an intrepid explorer who, somewhere in Africa, long ago, jumps into a river after the death of his lover and is devoured by a crocodile. Many swear they have seen a sad crocodile and a woman dressed in old-time clothes on the riverbank and that the two share a mysterious empathy.

Part 1—Paradise Lost

Three disparate women live in an old building in Lisbon. Aurora, an octogenarian living off her pension, eccentric, talkative and superstitious, and Santa, her housemaid from Cape Verde, live in the same apartment. Santa is semi-literate, but proficient in the divinatory art of vodun. Pilar, their neighbor and friend, middle-aged, Catholic, and a militant social benefactor, involves herself in their lives.

Pilar has another friend, a romantic painter in love, a gentleman who insists on offering her tacky pieces of art. But Pilar is more concerned with Aurora: with Aurora's solitude, with her frequent trips to the casino. She is even more worried about Santa, with her long silences and foreboding presence. Santa thinks it better to take care of oneself without annoying others, so she keeps quiet.

Something else concerns Aurora: understanding she will die soon, she feels someone is missing her, someone her friends have never heard about: Gian-Luca Ventura. So she asks Pilar to find him. She succeeds in doing so, but not long after receives word that Aurora has died. Gian-Luca is an old man, who lived in Mozambique, a former Portuguese colony. Another story emerges, beginning: "Aurora had a farm in Africa at the foothill of Mount Tabu..."

Part 2—Paradise

Gian-Luca, in voiceover, narrates the story of Aurora's life in 1960s Portuguese Mozambique. Aurora and her husband live together on their tea farm on the slopes of Mount Tabu. She is a skilled hunter, never missing a shot. She owns a small crocodile, a gift from her husband, which she keeps as a pet.

One day, the animal runs away. The pregnant Aurora finds it in Ventura's house, where they consummate their existing mutual attraction; a passionate and dangerous love affair ensues. Gian-Luca confides in his friend, Mario, about the affair. Mario demands that Gian-Luca end the affair and when he is ignored, the two start fighting. The heavily pregnant Aurora picks up a revolver and shoots and kills Mario. She later gives birth to a girl. Mario's killing by Aurore is covered up and linked to a guerilla group as pretext to ignite the Portuguese Colonial War. Aurora sends Gian-Luca a final latter. Two days later, Gian-Luca leaves Africa for good. He moves to India where, 10 years later, he hears of the death of Aurora's husband. Gian-Luca moves to Lisbon and makes his address known to Aurora, but does not receive a reply and decides not to pursue her. Gian-Luca explains that he respected Aurora's wishes and burned her final letter, asking him to leave Africa and expressing her guilt for the murder of Mario.

== Cast ==
- Teresa Madruga as Pilar
- Laura Soveral as Old Aurora
- Ana Moreira as Young Aurora
- Henrique Espírito Santo as Old Ventura
- Carloto Cotta as Young Ventura
- Isabel Muñoz Cardoso as Santa
- Ivo Müller as Aurora's Husband
- Manuel Mesquita as Mário
- Miguel Gomes as Narrator

== Reception ==
Tabu is the Portuguese film with the widest international distribution as of 2012 and the fifth from Portugal to be commercially released in New York (Film Forum, December 2012), after The Art of Amalia by Bruno de Almeida (2000, Quad Cinema), O Fantasma by João Pedro Rodrigues (2003, IFC Center) and, in 2011, The Strange Case of Angelica by Manoel de Oliveira (IFC Center) and Mists by Ricardo Costa (Quad Cinema).

=== Critical reception ===
Critic Peter Bradshaw of The Guardian awarded Tabu four out of five, and called the film "a gem: gentle, eccentric, possessed of a distinctive sort of innocence—and also charming and funny". But in his review of Tabu, New York Times critic A. O. Scott faults the director for glossing over the issues of colonialism in the film in favor of simple aestheticism. "Unlike other recent European films (like Philippe Falardeau’s Congorama and Claire Denis’s White Material), Tabu views colonialism as an aesthetic opportunity rather than a political or moral problem," wrote Scott. "It is full of longing—hedged, self-conscious, but palpable all the same—for a vanished way of life, in contrast to which contemporary reality seems drab and numb." This view was not shared by The New Yorker's critic Richard Brody, who wrote, "Gomes sees the predatory injustices of colonial life as a sort of Wild West of anarchic self-indulgence and self-reinvention . . . Nothing suggests nostalgia for or ambivalence about Portugal's colonial empire." Brody called Tabu "one of the most original and inventive—as well as trenchantly political and painfully romantic—movies of recent years".

On review aggregator website Rotten Tomatoes, the film has an approval rating of 88% based on 60 reviews, and an average rating of 7.9/10. The website’s consensus reads: "Mysterious and visually striking, Tabu rewards audiences' patience with a swooning romance shot with experimental flair". On Metacritic, the film has a weighted average score of 78 out of 100, based on 17 critics. Sight & Sound film magazine listed it at number two on its list of best films of 2012. In 2016, the film was ranked among the 100 greatest films since 2000 in an international poll of 177 critics.

== See also ==
- List of black-and-white films produced since 1970
