= João Salaviza =

Portuguese filmmaker

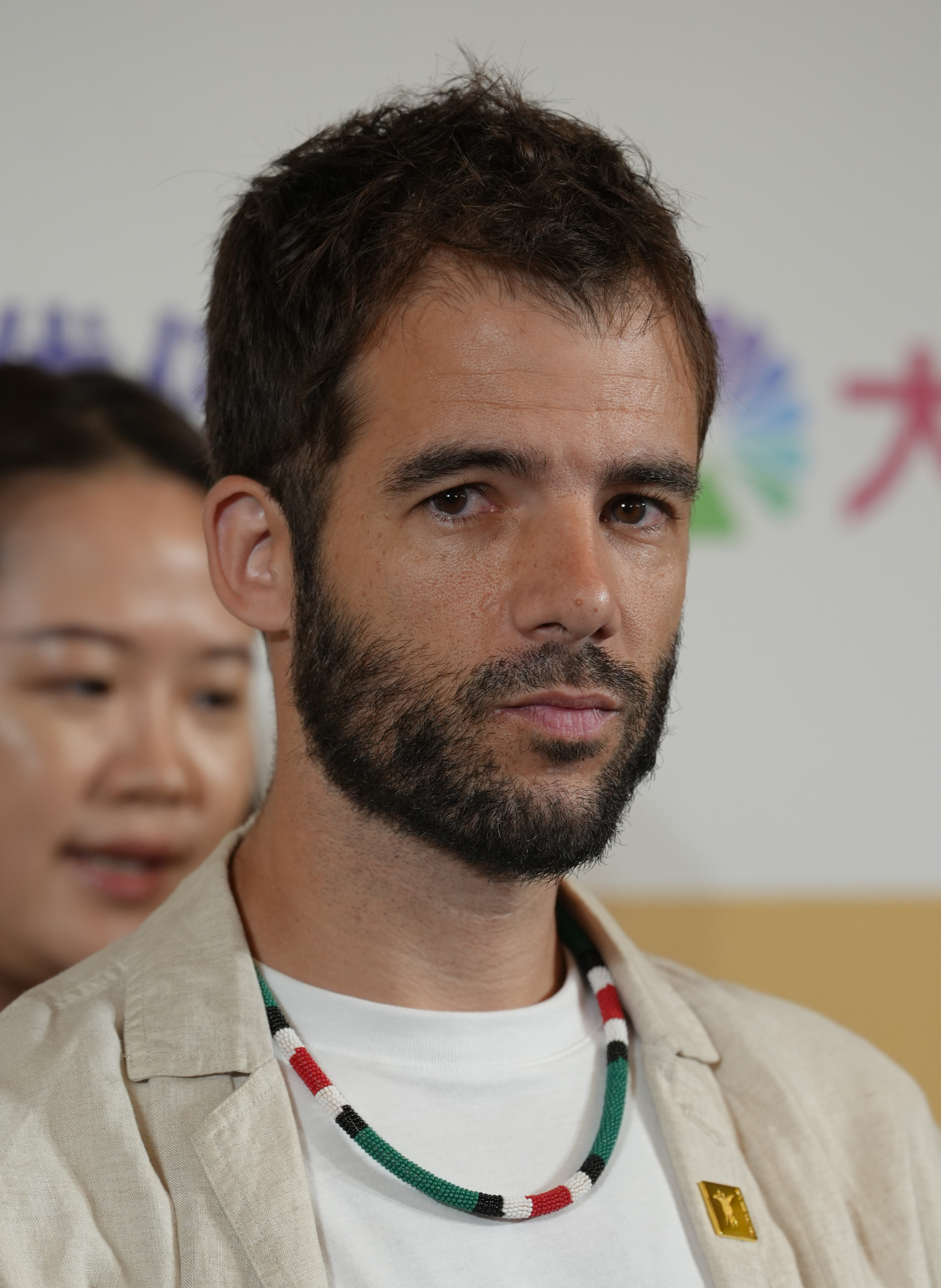
- Salaviza in 2026
- Born: João Salaviza Manso Feldman da Silva; 19 February 1984 (age 42); Lisbon, Portugal
- Education: Lisbon Theatre and Film School
- Occupations: Filmmaker; editor; producer; actor
- Years active: 1992–present

João Salaviza (born João Salaviza Manso Feldman da Silva; 19 February 1984) is a Portuguese filmmaker, editor, producer, and former actor. His accolades include the Short Film Golden Bear, the Short Film Palme d'Or, and the Un Certain Regard Jury Prize.

He is most known for his drama films The Dead and the Others (2018) and The Buriti Flower (2023), co-directed with Renée Nader Messora, about the Krahô indigenous population of Brazil.

== Biography ==
Salaviza was born on 19 February 1984, in Lisbon, Portugal. His father is José Edgar Feldman, a filmmaker, and his mother is a producer. He studied at the Lisbon Theatre and Film School and at the Universidad del Cine de Buenos Aires, in Buenos Aires, Argentina.

His film Arena won the Short Film Palme d'Or at the 2009 Cannes Film Festival. Salaviza also worked as assistant editor in Manoel de Oliveira's Eccentricities of a Blonde-Haired Girl (2009). In 2012, his film Rafa won the Short Film Golden Bear at the 62nd Berlin International Film Festival.

His debut feature, Montanha, was selected for the Critics’ Week at the 72nd Venice International Film Festival. His second feature, The Dead and the Others, won the Un Certain Regard Jury Special Prize at the 2018 Cannes Film Festival. His third feature, The Buriti Flower, won the Un Certain Regard Ensemble Prize at the 2023 Cannes Film Festival, as well as the Heterodox Award at the 17th Cinema Eye Honors.

In 2026, Salaviza presided over the Short Film jury for the 28th Shanghai International Film Festival.

=== Upcoming projects ===
His next feature film co-directed with Renée Nader Messora, Awkê, will mark his third production about the follow the Krahô indigenous community of Tocantins, Brazil. It is expected to be released in 2027.

== Filmography ==
=== Feature films ===
Year	English title	Original title	Notes
2015	Mountain	Montanha	
2018	The Dead and the Others	Chuva é Cantoria na Aldeia dos Mortos	Co-directed with Renée Nader Messora
2023	The Buriti Flower	A Flor do Buriti	Co-directed with Renée Nader Messora
TBA	Awkê		Post-production

=== Short films ===
- Duas Pessoas (2004)
- Arena (2009)
- Casa Na Comporta (2010)
- Hotel Müller (2010)
- Cerro Negro (2012)
- Rafa (2012)
- Russa (2018)

=== Documentaries ===
- STROKKUR (2011)
- High Cities of Bone (2017)
