= Miguel Gomes (director) =

Portuguese film director (born 1972)

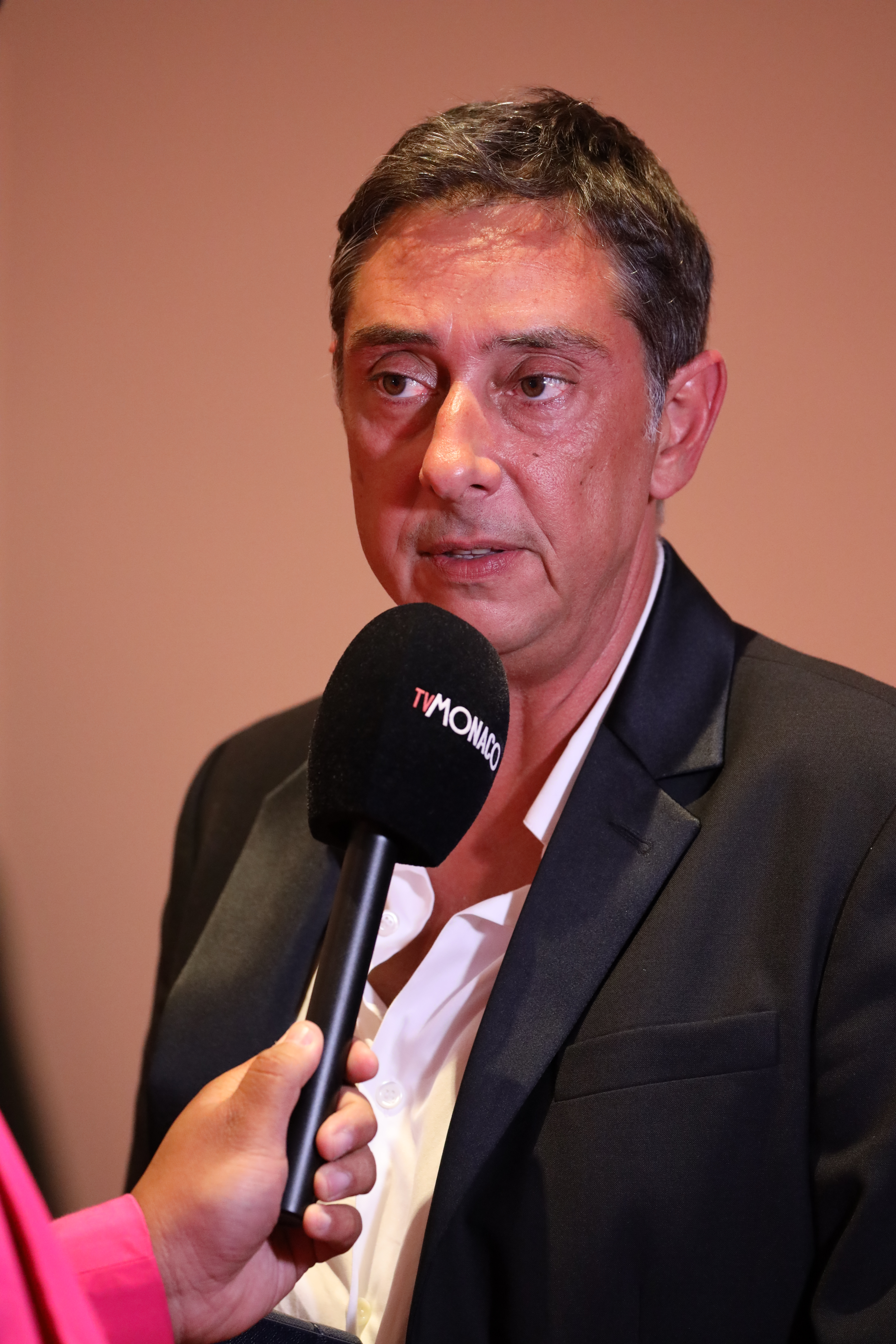
- Gomes in 2024
- Born: 1972 (age 53–54); Lisbon, Portugal
- Occupations: Film director; screenwriter; editor
- Years active: 2000 - present

Miguel Gomes (born 1972) is a Portuguese film director, screenwriter and editor. He studied cinema at Lisbon Theatre and Film School. His films include The Face You Deserve (2004), Our Beloved Month of August (2008) and Tabu (2012), Arabian Nights (2015) and Grand Tour (2024). For the last, he won Best Director at the 2024 Cannes Film Festival.

== Career ==
Trained at the Escola Superior de Teatro e Cinema, Gomes began his career as a film critic and author of theoretical writings on cinema. His early filmography includes The Face You Deserve (2004) and Our Beloved Month of August (2008).

His 2012 film, Tabu, was selected in the Competition programme at the 62nd Berlin International Film Festival, where it won the Alfred Bauer Prize for Artistic Innovation and the FIPRESCI Jury Prize. It also won the Grand Prix for Best Film at the 39th Film Fest Gent.

His 2015 film, Arabian Nights, premiered in the Directors' Fortnight section at the 68th Cannes Film Festival.

In 2024, Gomes was honored with a 'Special Program in Focus' at the 29th Busan International Film Festival, titled Miguel Gomes, a filmmaker of Joyful Melancholy. The program showcased the complete catalog of his eight feature films, from his 2004 debut The Face You Deserve to his latest work, Grand Tour, which won him Best Director at the 77th Cannes Film Festival. He was the first Portuguese director to ever win that award. He also conducted a masterclass, sharing insights into his creative process and cinematic vision.

In June 2025, Gomes was invited to join the Directors Branch of the Academy of Motion Picture Arts and Sciences.

In February 2026, Gomes started shooting Savagery, co-written by Maureen Fazendeiro, Mariana Ricardo and Telmo Churro, it's based on the Brazilian 1902 non-fiction book Os Sertões by Euclides da Cunha. Set shortly after the abolition of slavery in Brazil and the overthrow of the Portuguese monarchy from Brazil, it follows the War of Canudos, a popular revolt started by the impoverished residents of Canudos against the First Brazilian Republic. The project had been postponed several times, due to then-far-right Jair Bolsonaro government in Brazil, COVID-19 and budget difficulties. Principal photography begun in Portugal, but shooting is scheduled to take place in Brazil by August in Canudos. It stars Grace Passô.

== Filmography ==
=== Feature films ===
Year	English title	Original title	Notes
2004	The Face You Deserve	A Cara que Mereces	
2008	Our Beloved Month of August	Aquele Querido Mês de Agosto	
2012	Tabu		Alfred Bauer Prize winner at the 2012 Berlinale
2015	Arabian Nights	As Mil e uma Noites	
2021	The Tsugua Diaries	Diários de Otsoga	Co-directed with Maureen Fazendeiro
2024	Grand Tour		Best Director winner at the 2024 Cannes Film Festival
TBA	Savagery	Selvajaria	Filming

=== Short films ===
- 1999: Entretanto
- 2000: Christmas Inventory (Inventário De Natal)
- 2001: 31 Means Trouble (31)
- 2002: Kalkitos
- 2006: Canticle Of All Creatures (Cântico Das Criaturas)
- 2013: Redemption

== Awards and nominations ==
Award	Year	Category	Work	Result	Ref.
Berlin International Film Festival	2012	Alfred Bauer Award	Tabu	Won	
Berlin International Film Festival	2012	FIPRESCI Prize	Tabu	Won	
Cahiers du Cinéma	2012	Annual Top 10	Tabu	8th place	
Cahiers du Cinéma	2015	Annual Top 10	Arabian Nights	8th place	
Cannes Film Festival	2024	Best Director	Grand Tour	Won	
Chicago International Film Festival	2024	Silver Hugo – Best Director	Grand Tour	Won	
Film Fest Gent	2012	Grand Prix	Tabu	Won	
French Syndicate of Cinema Critics	2012	Best Foreign Film	Tabu	Won	
Gijón International Film Festival	2023	Honorary Award	—N/a	Honored	
Mar del Plata International Film Festival	2021	Astor Piazzolla Award for Best Direction (shared with Maureen Fazendeiro)	Diários de Otsoga	Won	
Sydney Film Festival	2015	Sydney Film Prize	Arabian Nights	Won	
