= List of Portuguese films of 2017 =

The following is a list of Portuguese films that were first released in 2017.

== Highest-grossing films ==
The following is a list of the 10 highest-grossing domestic films in Portugal that were first released in 2017, as of December 20, 2017, according to the Instituto do Cinema e do Audiovisual (Institute of Cinema and Audiovisual).

| Rank | Title | Gross |
|---|---|---|
| 1 | O Fim da Inocência | €346,242.96 |
| 2 | Jacinta | €240,765.94 |
| 3 | Perdidos | €179,001.31 |
| 4 | São Jorge | €218,395.74 |
| 5 | Fátima | €118,353.53 |
| 6 | Alguém Como Eu | €128,541.04 |
| 7 | Peregrinação | €105,962.90 |
| 8 | Malapata | €89,500.66 |
| 9 | 100 Metros | €83,274.38 |
| 10 | Índice Médio de Felicidade | €43,450.65 |

== List of films ==
| Release date | Title | Director | Cast | Genre | Notes | Ref |
|---|---|---|---|---|---|---|
| January 5 | Cruzeiro Seixas - As cartas do rei Artur | Cláudia Rita de Sousa Oliveira | | Documentary | | |
| January 5 | Zeus | Paulo Filipe Monteiro | | Biography, drama | | |
| January 12 | The Death of Louis XIV | Albert Serra | | Biography, drama | | |
| January 26 | Stalin's Couch | Fanny Ardant | | Drama | | |
| January 26 | Ama-San | Claúdia Varejão | | Documentary | | |
| February 9 | Eldorado XXI | Salomé Lamas | | Documentary | | |
| February 9 | Delírio em Las Vedras | Edgar Pêra | | Drama | | |
| March 9 | São Jorge | Marco Martins | | Comedy | | |
| March 16 | Malapata | Diogo Morgado | | Comedy, mystery | | |
| March 16 | Road 47 | Vicente Ferraz | | Drama, war | | |
| March 23 | Eusébio - História de uma Lenda | Filipe Ascensão | | Documentary | | |
| March 23 | Ornamento e Crime | Rodrigo Areias | | Drama, crime | | |
| March 30 | 100 Metros | Marcel Barrena | | Drama, comedy | | |
| April 13 | Jacinta | Jorge Paixão da Costa | | Biography, drama | | |
| April 20 | A Ilha dos Cães | Jorge António | | Adventure | | |
| April 27 | Fátima | João Canijo | | Drama | | |
| May 4 | Sonhar Portukália | António Bento Palma | | Drama, comedy | | |
| May 18 | Perdidos | Sérgio Graciano | | Adventure, drama, thriller | | |
| May 18 | Uma Vida à Espera | Sérgio Graciano | | Drama | | |
| May 25 | Por onde escapam as palavras | Luís Albuquerque | | Drama | | |
| June 15 | Terceiro Andar | Luciana Fina | | Documentary | | |
| July 13 | Treblinka | Sérgio Tréfaut | | Drama | | |
| August 31 | Índice Médio de Felicidade | Joaquim Leitão | | Drama | | |
| September 21 | The Nothing Factory | Pedro Pinho | | Drama, musical | | |
| September 28 | The Train of Salt and Sugar | Licínio Azevedo | | Adventure | | |
| October 5 | Al Berto | Vicente Alves do Ó | | Drama | | |
| October 12 | A Floresta das Almas Perdidas | José Pedro Lopes | | Horror, drama | | |
| October 12 | Alguém Como Eu | Leonel Vieira | | Comedy | | |
| October 19 | Porto | Gabe Klinger | | Drama, romance | | |
| October 26 | Todos os Sonhos do Mundo | Laurence Ferreira Barbosa | | Drama | | |
| November 1 | Nos Interstícios da Realidade ou o Cinema de António de Macedo | João Monteiro | | Documentary | | |
| November 1 | Peregrinação | João Botelho | | Adventure, drama | | |
| November 16 | Rosas de Ermera | Luís Filipe Rocha | | Documentary | | |
| November 23 | 3x3D | Jean-Luc Godard, Edgar Pêra, Peter Greenaway | | Experimental | | |
| November 23 | Centro Histórico | Manoel de Oliveira, Pedro Costa, Aki Kaurismäki, Víctor Erice | | Drama | | |
| November 30 | Verão Danado | Pedro Cabeleira | | Drama | | |
| November 30 | O Fim da Inocência | Joaquim Leitão | | Drama | | |

== See also ==
- 2017 in Portugal
