= David Ari Leon =

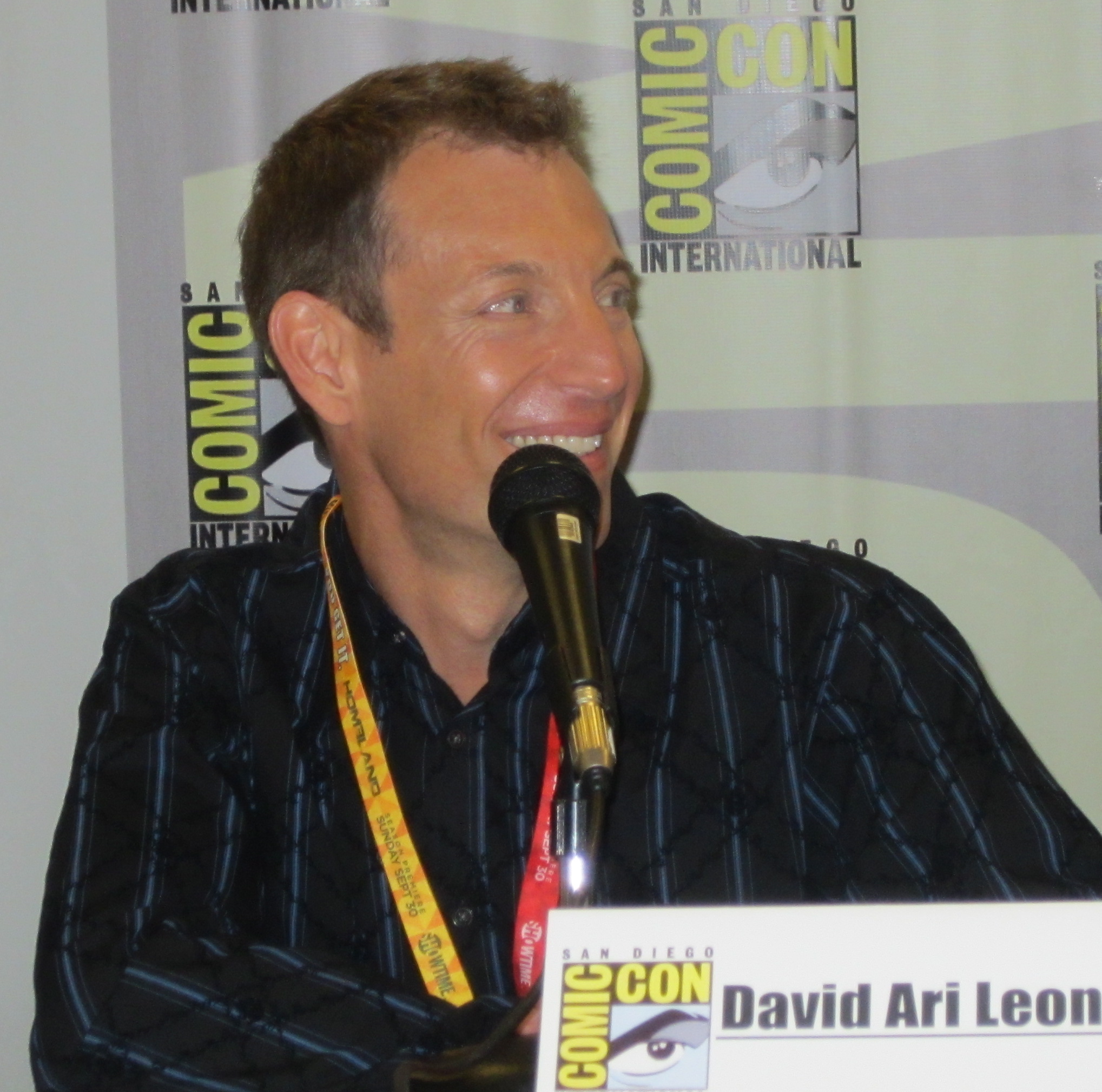
- Leon at the 2012 Comic-Con

Background information
- Born: December 12, 1967 (age 58); Los Angeles, California, United States
- Occupations: Composer, musician, songwriter, music supervisor
- Years active: 1990–present
- Labels: Vitamin Records, SoundMind Music
- Website: SoundMindMusic.com

David Ari Leon (born December 12, 1967) is an Emmy Award-nominated American composer, music supervisor songwriter and musician.

Leon's first professional music credit was in 1990 working with Danny Elfman on the feature film Nightbreed. He is best known for writing and supervising music for Marvel Entertainment on titles including Spider-Man and The Incredible Hulk. He is a songwriter on the themes to the Marvel series The Avengers: Earth's Mightiest Heroes and The Super Hero Squad Show, and composed the main title music to the shows Xyber 9: New Dawn and Mr. Bill Presents. Leon was commissioned by the Academy of Motion Pictures to compose music for their Academy Museum of Motion Pictures exhibition "Path to Cinema", as well as being commissioned by NASA to be the music supervisor on their video "29 Days on the Edge" about the James Webb Space Telescope, which NASA launched in 2021.

== Featured music ==
Leon has been featured as a music artist on NPR's syndicated programs Morning Edition and All Things Considered in ten episodes between the years 2005 to 2018.

He was also featured on the album "Rockabye Baby! Baby's Favorite Rock Songs," which was available exclusively at Starbucks March 23 – April 19, 2010. The album reached #3 on Billboard's Kids Albums chart, #18 on the Billboard Independent Albums, and #111 on the Billboard Top 200. It contains a version of the Rolling Stones song "Ruby Tuesday" that Leon performed and produced for the Rockabye Baby! series, which also features the artists Björk, Journey, and Kanye West.

== Education and early career ==
=== College ===
In 1990, Leon received a B.A. degree from UCLA in music composition, where he focused on piano performance, film scoring and electronic music production. While attending the university, he did internships with Academy Award-nominated composers Mark Isham and Danny Elfman, the latter of which resulted in Leon's first feature film credit on the Clive Barker film Nightbreed. After leaving university, Leon worked on Days of Our Lives, garnering him an Emmy nomination for Outstanding Music Director.

=== Marvel and Fox ===
In 1994, Leon began working for New World, the parent company of Marvel at that time, as music director and composer on the TV series Valley of the Dolls. The following year (1995) was the start of his work for Marvel as composer and music supervisor on the show Spider-Man, along with other titles for Fox Kids.

Leon subsequently held a vice president of music title for Fox from 1997 to 2002. During that time, he received music supervisor credits on many film and television projects for Fox such as the miniseries Les Misérables starring John Malkovich and the primetime series State of Grace, starring Frances McDormand.

=== Later works ===
Leon has performed and arranged songs for a series of albums on Vitamin Records by artists including Neil Young, The Cure, R.E.M. and Pink Floyd. He has also music supervised and written music for a series of interactive and Motion Comics for Marvel, starting with Astonishing X-Men by Joss Whedon, and including Captain America: The Winter Soldier, the first digital comic to have an interactive soundtrack. Leon's other work for Marvel includes being the music supervisor on eight films co-produced by Lions Gate including Thor: Tales of Asgard and The Invincible Iron Man. In 2019, Leon wrote a series of songs for the Netflix Original series Super Monsters. While continuing his TV music work on shows such as the Emmy winning ABC show Sea Rescue and the Emmy nominated ABC show The Wildlife Docs, Leon has also scored music for popular titles for EA and other interactive companies. Games with Leon's music include Contre Jour, Superman, Snoopy Coaster and Woody Woodpecker, which garnered Leon a Hollywood Music in Media Award nomination for his original score to the title. Leon's music was included in Kiwaka, an educational game exploring the concept of tangential learning.

== Filmography ==
Works with a credit of Music Supervisor and/or Composer
Year(s)	Title	Credited as		Notes
Year(s)	Title	Music Supervisor	Composer	Notes
1990- -1994	Days of Our Lives	✓		NBCUniversal, 300 episodes Emmy Nomination, Outstanding Music
1994	Valley of the Dolls	✓	✓	A Fox series, 65 episodes
1995- -1998	Spider-Man		✓	A Marvel series 65 episodes
1995	Mighty Morphin Power Rangers	✓		A Fox series, 28 episodes
1996	Masked Rider	✓		A Fox series, 40 episodes
1996	Oliver Twist	✓	✓	
1996	Power Rangers Zeo	✓		
1996- -1997	The Incredible Hulk	✓	✓	A Marvel series 21 episodes
1996- -1998	Dragon Ball Z	✓		Music Supervised 53 episodes of this series
1997	Turbo: A Power Rangers Movie	✓		A 20th Century Studios film
1997	Big Bad Beetleborgs	✓		Music Supervised 88 episodes of this series
1998	Rusty: A Dog's Tale	✓		A film starring Rodney Dangerfield
1998	Richie Rich's Christmas Wish	✓		A film starring Eugene Levy
1998	Ohh Nooo! Mr. Bill Presents	✓	✓	A 20th Century Studios series starring Rowan Atkinson, 53 episodes
1998	Like Father, Like Santa	✓		A film starring Harry Hamlin
1998	Power Rangers in Space	✓		
1999	Mystic Knights of Tir Na Nog	✓		A 20th Century Studios series, 50 episodes
1999	Power Rangers Lost Galaxy	✓		
2000	Les Misérables	✓		A miniseries starring John Malkovich
2000	St. Patrick: The Irish Legend	✓		Recorded an Irish choir in Dublin for this film with Inon Zur
2000	Power Rangers Lightspeed Rescue	✓		
2000	Time Share	✓		A Fox film Starring Timothy Dalton
2000- -2001	Spider-Man Unlimited	✓		A Marvel series, 13 episodes
2001	State of Grace	✓		An ABC series starring Frances McDormand
2001	Three Days	✓		A film starring Kristin Davis
2006	Ultimate Avengers	✓		A Marvel Studios / Lionsgate film
2000- -2007	Xyber 9	✓	✓	A Fox series starring Tim Curry
2007	Invincible Iron Man	✓		A Marvel Studios / Lionsgate film
2007	Doctor Strange	✓		A Marvel Studios / Lionsgate film
2008	Next Avengers	✓		A Marvel Studios / Lionsgate film
2008	Wolverine and the X-Men	✓		A Marvel series, 26 episodes
2009- -2011	The Super Hero Squad Show	✓	✓	A Marvel Series, Theme with Parry Gripp
2009	Hulk Vs.	✓		A Marvel Studios / Lionsgate film
2010	Iron Man: Extremis	✓	✓ (Theme)	A Marvel series, Theme with Guy Erez, sung by Glen Phillips
2010	Planet Hulk	✓		A Marvel Studios / Lionsgate film
2011	Superman		✓	An EA / Warner Bros. game
2011	Thor: Tales of Asgard	✓		A Marvel Studios / Lionsgate film
2011	Contre Jour		✓	An EA Game, Won "iPad Game of the Year" Award from Apple in 2011
2010- -2012	The Avengers: Earth's Mightiest Heroes	✓	✓ (Theme)	A Marvel Series, Theme song with Guy Erez
2012	E.T. The Green Planet		✓	An EA game
2012	Astonishing X-Men	✓		A Marvel miniseries
2012	Woody Woodpecker		✓	An EA / NBCUniversal game with An HMMA Award nominated music score
2013	Snoopy Coaster		✓	An EA / Peanuts game. Soundtrack described as "amazing" by reviewer.
2013- -2018	The Wildlife Docs	✓	✓	An Emmy nominated ABC series 130 episodes
2014	Kiwaka		✓	A game made with ESA
2018- -2019	Super Monsters		✓	Songwriter on 10 original songs for this Netflix series.
2012- -2021	Sea Rescue	✓	✓	An Emmy-winning ABC series 178 episodes
2021	NASA's "29 Days on the Edge" for the JWST	✓		NASA Nominated for Webby Award
2025	Committee Animal	✓		A film starring Leslie Zemeckis
