= Headway (app) =

Book summary mobile app

Headway App
- Developer: GTHW App Limited
- Release: January 2019
- Operating system: iOS (16.0+), iPadOS (16.0+), watchOS (9.0+), Android, CarPlay, Android Auto
- Platform: Mobile, Web, Wearable, In-car
- Available in: English, Spanish, Portuguese (BR), German, Italian, French
- Type: Education, Microlearning
- License: Proprietary
- Website: makeheadway.com

Headway, also known as the Headway App, is an educational technology (EdTech) product that provides short text and audio summaries of nonfiction books. The product was launched in 2019 by Anton Pavlovsky and is developed by Headway Inc, a global consumer tech company that operates in the lifelong learning space.

== History ==
The Headway app was launched in January 2019, with the first version of the application released the same year.

In 2021, Headway ranked first globally in downloads within the book summary application niche.

In 2022, the application received the Golden Novum Design Award for product design.

In 2023 and 2024, Headway appeared in several App Store editorial selections, including App of the Day in multiple countries, and received an Editors’ Choice label in the United States.

In April 2025, the application was listed as a Webby Honoree in the Learning & Education category.

The company has also launched the Headway Scholarship for Book Lovers.

As of 2025, publicly available reporting notes that the Headway app has surpassed 50 million downloads and is among the Top 10 iOS applications by revenue in the Education category worldwide.

== Products and features ==
The Headway app provides short-form summaries of nonfiction books in both text and audio formats. Content is produced by an in-house team of writers, editors, and voice actors. Features include highlighting and saving key insights, spaced repetition for knowledge retention, and offline access to downloaded summaries. The app is available on iOS, iPadOS, watchOS, Android, CarPlay, and Android Auto, and supports multiple languages.

== Pricing ==
Headway operates on a subscription business model, with optional paid plans alongside free access. The company publicly provides its terms of use, privacy policy, subscription details, and AI usage policy on its official website.

== Technology and integrations ==
Headway reports that its book summaries are written and edited manually, while artificial intelligence tools are used in limited supporting functions, such as experimental conversational features and selected marketing processes.

== Adoption ==
According to figures released by the company, the app has exceeded 50 million downloads worldwide. Sensor Tower data indicates that Headway has been the most downloaded application in its niche since October 2020. In January 2025, the app claimed the #1 position in the Education category in both the United States and United Kingdom App Stores and remained among the Top 10 iOS applications globally by revenue within the Education category.

== Awards ==
The Headway app has received several product-level distinctions. In 2023 and 2024, it appeared in multiple App Store editorial selections, including App of the Day features and an Editors’ Choice label in the United States. In 2025, the app was recognized as a Webby Honoree in the Learning & Education category. The product has also been featured in independent media roundups of notable educational applications.
