= Back in Time (iOS software) =

World history app for iPad

- Developer: Landka
- Release: iPad; September 22, 2011 iPhone; December, 2011
- Platform: iOS
- Available in: English, French, German, Japanese, Portuguese, Simplified Chinese, Spanish
- Type: Education Book App
- Website: landka.com/apps/back-in-time

Back in Time is an education book app for iOS about the history of the universe, earth, life and mankind that uses a time analogy to explain different timescales. Released on September 22, 2011, it was developed by the software company Landka in collaboration with scientific institutions such as ESA/Hubble Space Telescope. The app was featured worldwide in the App Store and rapidly became a success, reaching the top sales of iPad book apps in 38 countries. Back in Time was distinguished by The New York Times and selected for the top 10 apps of the year. In 2012 it was recognized with a World Summit Award (UN based initiative).

== Features ==
Back in Time is a cross between a history textbook and a multimedia encyclopedia. The app presents 50 key events since the beginning of the universe until the present day covering different timescales such as the chronology of the universe, the geological history of earth, the evolutionary history of life and human history. In order to better understand these timescales, the app proposes a time analogy where the entire age of the universe (13.7 billion years) is scaled into a 24-hour clock. Navigation is possible by browsing several timelines or by rewinding the pointers of a clock to go back in time. The text of each chapter is complemented with images, videos, interactive timelines, animations and trivia. The app's soundtrack was produced by Rodrigo Leão.

== Time analogy ==
Back in Time uses a time analogy where the entire age of the universe is scaled into a 24-hour clock. According to this analogy life on Earth emerged at 5:20 pm.

Back in Time presents the most relevant events in history using a 24-hour clock as a time analogy. This analogy scales the entire age of the universe (13.7 billion years) into a single day (24 hours) so that the beginning of the universe (Big Bang) started at 0:00h and at present time the imaginary clock reads 24:00h. Back in Time uses this analogy as a method to visualize and compare key events in the history of the universe, of earth, life, and human history. This analogy was originally proposed by Astronomer Bob Lambert from the John J. McCarthy Observatory as a tool for helping students visualizing large timescales.

Key events in History presented using the 24-hour analogy (excerpt from Back in Time)
	24-hours analogy	Chronology	Event	Description
Universe	0:00	13.7 billion years ago	Big Bang	Creation of the Universe
Universe	0:21	13.5 billion years ago	First Stars	First stars were born
Universe	8:35	8.8 billion years ago	Milky Way	The Milky Way takes the shape of a galactic disk
Universe	15:56	4.6 billion years ago	Solar System	Formation of the Solar System
Life	17:20	3.8 billion years ago	Life on Earth	First traces of life on Earth
Life	23:02	545 million years ago	Cambrian Explosion	Sudden increase in sea life diversity
Life	23:10	475 million years ago	Land Plants	First records of land plants
Life	23:35	230 million years ago	Rise of the Dinosaurs	Dinosaurs became the dominant terrestrial vertebrates
Life	23:53	65.5 million years ago	K-T Extinction	Mass extinction (massive asteroid impact)
Humankind	23:59:44	2.5 million years ago	Cradle of Humankind	Australopithecus
Humankind	23:59:59	200 000 years ago	Homo Sapiens	Last known link in the evolution of humanity
Humankind	-442 ms *	70 000 years ago	Human migrations	Homo Sapiens migrates out of Africa
Humankind	-76 ms *	12 000 years ago	Cradle of Civilization	Rise of civilization
Humankind	-32 ms *	5 000 years ago	Writing	Beginning of recorded history

* milliseconds before midnight

== Development and release ==
Back in Time was developed by the Portuguese software company Landka over a period of 10 months. The iPad version was released on the App Store on September 22, 2011. The initial version included 44 chapters and was available in 5 languages (English, Spanish, German, French and Portuguese). Subsequent upgrades included additional chapters, translation into two more languages (Chinese and Japanese) and support for retina display.

A dedicated version for iPhone was released in December 2011. In June 2013, a version of the app for Microsoft Windows was released as a result of a collaboration between the developers and Intel with the purpose of showcase the capabilities of Windows 8.

== Reception and awards ==
Upon release, Back in Time was featured in the App Store worldwide and rapidly became a success, reaching the top sales of iPad book apps in 38 countries. The app received generally positive reviews from the users (4.8/5.0 rating score on the App Store) and press. Back in Time was featured by The New York Times for the top 10 apps of the year.

The app was selected by the American Photo Magazine for the top 10 Photo eBooks of the year, distinguished by BBC as one of the 10 best history apps, and was recommended by several education publications. In 2012, Back in Time won a World Summit Award (UN based initiative) for Learning and Education.
