= Landka =

Mobile software development company

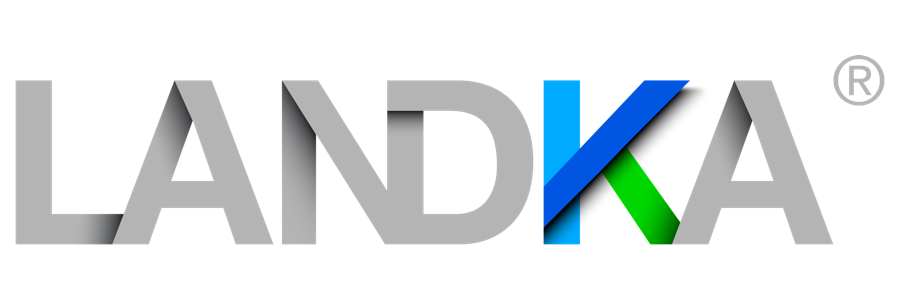
- Type: Private
- Industry: Mobile app development
- Genre: Educational apps, Educational games
- Founded: 2010
- Headquarters: Portugal
- Products: Back in Time; Kiwaka; Kiwaka Story; Overpaint; Art Legacy; Art Legacy Live; Live Gallery; Stars and Ghosts; Earth and Science
- Website: http://landka.com

Landka is a mobile software development company focused on educational apps. Notable products include Back in Time, Kiwaka and Art Legacy.

== History ==
The Portuguese company was founded in 2010 and gained notability with its flagship product Back in Time, an educational iPad app about world history. Back in Time was released in September 2011 and brought instant success to Landka, being featured in the App Store worldwide and reaching the top sales of iPad book apps in nearly 40 countries. This project won Landka a World Summit Award (a United Nations-funded initiative) in Learning and Education and was later ported to Windows thanks to a partnership between Landka and Intel. Also in 2011, Back in Time was named by The New York Times as one of the top 10 apps of the year.

Later developments included ThinkO (2012), a brain-training game released in 2012 that became one of the most downloaded apps in Brazil, and Kiwaka (2014), an educational game to teach children about astronomy developed in collaboration with ESA and ESO.

In 2015, Landka released Overpaint, an educational game about colors, and Art Legacy, an educational book app about the most relevant paintings in the history of art, that won the company another nomination for the World Summit Awards.

== Apps ==
Title	Year	Description
Back in Time	2011	Education book app for iOS presenting key events in the history of the universe, earth, life, mankind and civilization that uses a time analogy to explain different timescales.
ThinkO	2012	Puzzle game for iOS where the goal is to clear the board by moving rows and columns of colored rings into the matching squares. (discontinued)
Kiwaka	2014	Educational game designed to teach children about astronomy. The app explores the concept of tangential learning by presenting scientific information about stars and constellations as a reward for completing game levels. Developed in collaboration with scientific institutions such as the European Space Agency (ESA) and the European Southern Observatory (ESO). Available for iOS, macOS, and tvOS.
Kiwaka Story	2014	Interactive book app for children that tells the story about the characters in the game Kiwaka to teach children about the constellations in the night sky. Available for iOS, macOS, and tvOS.
Overpaint	2015	Puzzle game for mobile devices that explores the ability to mesh primary colors to clear a board of moving circles. Available for iOS, macOS and tvOS, Android, and Windows.
Art Legacy	2015	Education book app about the most famous paintings in art history. The paintings are interactive through a parallax effect. Available for iOS, macOS, and tvOS.
Art Legacy Live	2016	Screensaver app that displays famous paintings using a parallax effect. Available for iOS, macOS, tvOS, Android, and Windows.
Live Gallery	2016	Screensaver app that displays nature photos using a parallax effect. Available for iOS, macOS, tvOS, Android, and Windows.
Stars and Ghosts	2016	Side-scrolling Halloween-themed game. Simple one-touch game controlling a flying witch in a broomstick. Available for iOS, macOS, tvOS, and Android.
Earth and Science	2021	Educational app that explains key concepts in the field of earth and life sciences. Available for iOS and macOS.

== See also ==
- Thinkful
- Headway Inc
