= Diogo Morgado =

Portuguese actor (born 1981)

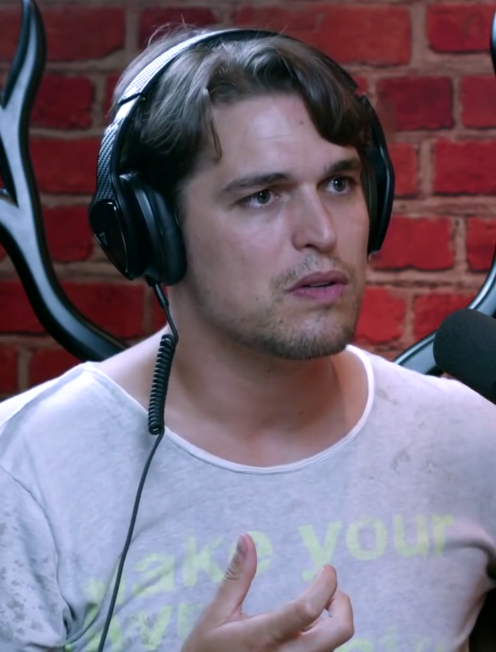
- Diogo Morgado in 2015
- Born: Diogo Miguel Morgado Soares; 17 January 1981 (age 45); Lisbon, Portugal
- Occupations: Actor, director, screenwriter, streamer and youtuber
- Years active: 1996–present
- Partner: Cátia Oliveira
- Children: 2

Diogo Miguel Morgado Soares (born 17 January 1981) is a Portuguese actor who may be best known for his portrayal of Jesus in the History Channel epic mini-series The Bible and in the film Son of God.

== Early life ==
Morgado was born in Campo Grande, Lisbon, Portugal on 17 January 1981.

In addition to his native Portuguese, Morgado is fluent in French, Spanish and English.

== Career ==
Morgado is well-known in his native Portugal and one of GQ's "Men of the Year", Morgado's career spans top television, film and stage productions, including a lead role in the No. 1 rated Portuguese television series and International Emmy winner, Laços de Sangue.

Morgado began his career at the age of fifteen when he joined the cast of top rated television series Terra Mãe (1998), Diário de Maria (1998), followed by A Lenda da Garça (2000) and A Febre do Ouro Negro (2000). His performance as Miguel in the 2000 telefilm Amo-Te, Teresa earned Morgado high regard as one of the most promising actors of his generation and the TV movie is still one of the highest rated ever in Portugal. Morgado has worked consistently in Portuguese television with over 15 series regular roles, many with the distinguished SIC network. Morgado's film credits include a noteworthy performance in the title role of Portuguese dictator António De Oliveira Salazar in the hit feature film A Vida Privada De Salazar. Morgado was also able to showcase his comedic chops in O Crime do Padre Amaro, which received international attention from directors all over the world. Morgado is also a passionate theater actor and had lead roles in prestigious plays such as David Hare's Skylight and Peter Shaffer's The Royal Hunt to the Sun.

Beyond Portugal, Morgado has had lead roles in a few international films, like Spain's Dos Rivales Casi Iguales and Star Crossed, and Brazil's Revelação and The Jungle. Morgado has also wrapped leading roles in two independent films in the U.S. – the gritty urban drama Red Butterfly and the action-filled adrenaline film Born to Race: Fast Track. Morgado was recently seen on Portuguese television as Eduardo in the SIC series Sol de Inverno. He also starred in the recent Portuguese comedy film, Virados do Avesso, which debuted at the top of the Portuguese box office.

Morgado also voiced the children's book app, Kiwaka Story, published by Landka, and to the Portuguese adaptation of several video games, including Detroit: Become Human and Infamous Second Son. More recently, Morgado begun writing and directing films: his short film, Excuse, was awarded 'Best Short Drama' at the 2018 Silicon Beach Film Festival and he was distinguished by his short film Signal in the L.A. Independent Shorts Awards.

Morgado is perhaps best known in the United States for his portrayal of Jesus in 20th Century Fox's feature film Son of God (for which he received an Imagen Award nomination) and in History Channel's Emmy-nominated miniseries, The Bible, which was the highest-rated cable program of 2013. He also appeared on the hit ABC drama Revenge as Dr. Jorge Velez. In 2015, Morgado starred as "The Man" (aka The Devil) in the CW's drama series, The Messengers.

== Personal life ==
Morgado currently lives in Portugal. He has two sons: Santiago (born 2009) and Afonso (born 2016).

== Filmography ==
=== Television ===
- 1997 – Terra Mãe – Miguel
- 1999 – A Lenda da Garça – Manuel Domingos
- 2000 – Ajuste de Contas – Francisco
- 2002/2003 – Tudo Por Amor – Pedro Castelo Branco
- 2005 – Os Malucos nas Arábias
- 2006 – Floribela – Dinis Mendonça
- 2007 – Vingança – Santiago Medina
- 2008 – Rebelde Way – Mauro Galvão
- 2008 – Podia Acabar o Mundo – Rodrigo Fortunato Louro
- 2008 – Revelação – Antônio
- 2009 – Novos Malucos do Riso
- 2010 – Lua Vermelha – Artur
- 2010 – Laços de Sangue – João Caldas Ribeiro
- 2013/2014 – Sol de Inverno – Eduardo Aragão
- 2017 – Ouro Verde – José-Maria Magalhães / Jorge Monforte

=== Miniseries and series ===
- 1997 – A Mulher do Senhor Ministro – Modelo
- 1998 – Diário de Maria – Luís
- 1999 – Jornalistas – Bruno
- 1999 – A Hora da Liberdade – Teixeira
- 1999 – Médico de Família – Decorador
- 2000 – A Febre do Ouro Negro – Bob
- 2001 – Estação da Minha Vida
- 2001 – Teorema de Pitágoras
- 2002 – O Quinto dos Infernos – D. Pedro Carlos de Bourbon
- 2004 – O Prédio do Vasco – Doctor
- 2004/2005 – Inspector Max – Rui Leão / Miguel
- 2004/2005 – Maré Alta – Ship Passenger
- 2005 – Malucos e Filhos
- 2005 – Malucos na Praia
- 2005 – O Diário de Sofia
- 2006 – 7 vidas – Adamo
- 2006/2008 – Aqui Não Há Quem Viva – Fernando
- 2007 – Uma Aventura – Jaime
- 2008 – Malucos no Hospital
- 2009 – A Vida Privada de Salazar – António Oliveira Salazar
- 2010 – Tempo Final – Pedro
- 2011 – Os Substitutos – voz de Dick Daring (Dubbing)
- 2013 – The Bible – Jesus
- 2014 – Revenge – Dr. Jorge Velez
- 2015 – Alisa – A Heroína do Futuro – voz de Arik Sapojkov (Dubbing)
- 2015 – The Messengers – The Man
- 2015/2016 – CSI: Cyber – Miguel Vega
- 2018 – MacGyver – Carlos

=== Films ===
- 2000 – Amo-te Teresa – Miguel (telefilm)
- 2000 – A Noiva – Eduardo (telefilm)
- 2001 – Teorema de Pitágoras – Raul
- 2003 – A Selva – Alberto
- 2003 – Lisboa Regressa ao Parque
- 2004 – Vá Para Fora... Ou Vai Dentro!
- 2005 – O Crime do Padre Amaro – Libaninho
- 2007 – The Italian Writer – Joseph
- 2007 – Dos rivales casi iguales – Vicente
- 2007 – Acredita, Estou Possuído! – Jorge
- 2009 – Star Crossed - Amor em Jogo – Hugo Pereira
- 2009 – Mami Blue – Pancho
- 2012 – Maria Coroada – Basílio (telefilm)
- 2012 – A Teia de Gelo – Jorge
- 2014 – Red Butterfly – Antonio Vega Jr.
- 2014 – Fast Lane – Enzo Lauricello
- 2014 – Son of God – Jesus
- 2014 – Virados do Avesso – João Salgado
- 2014 – Women of the Bible – Jesus
- 2016 – Love Finds You in Valentine – Derek Sterling
- 2017 – Malapata – Barbosa
- 2017 – O Matador – Cabeleira
- 2018 – Parque Mayer – Eduardo
- 2021 – The Unholy – Monsignor Delgarde

=== Programs ===
- 2000 – Lux – presenter
- 2001 – Mundo Vip – presenter
- 2004 – Dá-lhe Gás – presenter
