= Kiwaka =

Educational game about astronomy

- Developer: Landka
- Publisher: Landka
- Composer: David Ari Leon
- Platforms: iOS; macOS; tvOS
- Release: iOS; June 5, 2014 tvOS+macOS; May 18, 2017
- Genre: Educational game

Kiwaka is an educational game for iOS, macOS and tvOS designed to teach children about astronomy. The app was developed by the Portuguese software company Landka in collaboration with scientific institutions such as the European Space Agency (ESA) and the European Southern Observatory (ESO).

Kiwaka explores the concept of tangential learning. In the game, an elephant lights up stars to complete constellations and, after each level, an education module is presented to learn more about these constellations. The importance of rules that regulate learning modules and game experience is discussed by Moreno, C., in a case study about Kiwaka.

The app was featured in the Kids section of the App Store and reached the top sales of apps for kids in 9 countries.

== Features ==
Kiwaka is part game and part lesson, combining entertainment and education. The concept behind the app is a true legend according to witch "fireflies carry lights from the stars". The purpose of the game is to help a pink elephant to catch fireflies revealing constellations in the night sky. Once all the stars in a constellation are completed, detailed information about the constellation is provided, such as the description of the associated greek myth, a video explaining how to find the constellation in the night sky and the location and description of the most important stars, galaxies and nebulae. Soundtrack was composed by the Emmy nominee David Ari Leon.

=== Game Story ===
The game takes place in Kiwaka (a real location in Democratic Republic of Congo, Africa) where four creatures learn about an ancient legend according to witch fireflies carry the light from the stars. The creatures take on a journey to collect fireflies and learn about the mysteries and ancient myths behind each constellation. An interactive book app "Kiwaka Story" telling the tale of the characters was launched simultaneously with the game. The book app is targeted at young children and narrated by Diogo Morgado.

=== Gameplay ===
Kiwaka gameplay: Collect fireflies to light up constellations in the night sky

Kiwaka is a side-scrolling game with a simple tap control system. The player controls a pink elephant (Kudi) as he travels in a floating soap bubble collecting fireflies and avoiding different obstacles. Each firefly will light up a star in the night sky revealing hidden constellations. At the end of each level the player can look at a star map and learn about the constellations "earned" throughout the game. Two interactive star maps are presented: one for the northern hemisphere constellations and the other for the southern hemisphere constellations.

=== Tangential Learning ===
Kiwaka engages tangential learning by providing relevant scientific information about stars and constellations "earned" throughout the game. This information includes astronomy details about the constellations, an explanation on how to find the constellation in the night sky, and the locations, descriptions and images of the most important stars, galaxies and nebulae. Most of these images come from the European Space Agency (ESA) and the European Southern Observatory (ESO) image libraries and depict deep-space objects that can actually be found in the constellations. Links are provided to ESA and ESO websites for more information about these objects.

Kiwaka also presents information about the classical mythology behind each constellation. Users are introduced to classical Greek literature examples, such as the story of Cassiopeia and the myth of Perseus and the Medusa. The drawings of constellations depicted in the app are from Firmamentum Sobiescianum sive Uranographia, the famous Atlas of constellations by Johannes Hevelius.

== Development and release ==
The project Kiwaka was developed by Landka over a period of two years leading to the simultaneously publication of the iOS game Kiwaka and the book app "Kiwaka Story" on June 5, 2014. Kiwaka was featured in Kids section of the App Store and reached the top sales of apps for kids in 9 countries. The macOS and tvOS versions were released in May 2017. The app received generally positive reviews from press and scientific community.
