= Love Finds You in Valentine =

2016 American television romantic drama film by Terry Cunningham

- Film poster
- Written by: Bryar Freed
- Directed by: Terry Cunningham
- Starring: Michaela McManus; Diogo Morgado
- Music by: Jamie Christopherson
- Country of origin: United States
- Original language: English

Production
- Running time: 88 minutes
- Production company: Mission Pictures International

Original release
- Release: February 14, 2016

Love Finds You in Valentine is a 2016 American TV romantic drama film directed by Terry Cunningham. The film stars Michaela McManus and Diogo Morgado in the lead roles. The film was released on February 14, 2016, coinciding with the Valentine's Day.

== Synopsis ==
Kennedy (Michaela McManus) travels up to the small town of Valentine Nebraska to sell a ranch that she's inherited, but first wants to spend the summer in the home to discover more about her family history.

== Cast ==
- Michaela McManus as Kennedy Blaine
- Diogo Morgado as Derek Sterling
- Hunter Cross as Steve
- James Kisicki as Gregory Talbot
- Lindsay Wagner as June Sterling
- Danny Rios as Ray Lazaro
- Brian Bartels as Pastor Morgan
- Ed Asner as Gabriel Morgan
