= Snoopy Coaster =

2013 endless runner game

- Official cover art, depicting (from left to right) Snoopy, Charlie Brown, Linus van Pelt, and Lucy van Pelt on a roller coaster train
- Developer: CGMatic
- Publisher: Chillingo
- Director: Paige Braddock
- Producers: Adam Barker; Chin C.; Paul B.
- Programmers: Korrakot S.; Chanwit S.
- Artists: Charinee Su.; Sathinee Ch.; Nut Na.
- Composer: David Ari Leon
- Series: Peanuts
- Platforms: iOS; Android
- Release: WW: March 21, 2013
- Genre: Endless runner
- Mode: Single-player

Snoopy Coaster is a mobile endless runner game developed by CGMatic and published by Chillingo for iOS and Android devices in March 2013. An installment in the Peanuts video game series, the game sees the player controlling Snoopy, who drives a roller coaster train through multiple different environments, most commonly a theme park.

Snoopy Coaster received mixed reception from critics, who criticized how the game was "almost a re-release" of CGMatic's 2012 title Madcoaster, which some felt had "simple" gameplay. Critics were more positive towards how the game could be nostalgic for Peanuts fans. On June 2, 2013, Snoopy Coaster was the best-selling free game on iOS systems in multiple countries.

== Gameplay ==
The player driving in the game's theme park environment

Snoopy Coaster is an endless runner game and sees the player controlling Snoopy, who drives a roller coaster train through different locations, such as a theme park and haunted house. The train features the Peanuts characters Charlie Brown, Linus van Pelt, Peppermint Patty, and Lucy van Pelt as passengers. The game is score-based, with the player's score increasing the longer they keep the train from crashing. Another way the player can increase their score is by collecting coins, which are scattered throughout the game.

While driving, players will come across different obstacles and roller coaster elements, such as a triple vertical loop. Multiple objects and animals will also appear throughout the game, which also increases the player's score when hit with the train.

== Development and release ==
Snoopy Coaster was developed by CGMatic, who had previously also developed Madcoaster, which had similar gameplay to Snoopy Coaster. The game was published by Chillingo, a subsidiary of Electronic Arts.

Snoopy Coaster was first announced in early March 2013 and was set to release later the same month. The game later released on March 21 on mobile devices, with a launch price of $0.99. The game was later made free on May 2. Later, at an unknown time, Snoopy Coaster was removed from the App Store.

== Reception ==
Reception

Review scores
Publication	Score
AppSpy	3/5
Pocket Gamer	3/5

Snoopy Coaster received mixed reviews from critics, who criticized the game for being almost identical to Madcoaster. Some critics noted how the game could have a nostalgia factor for Peanuts fans, with AppSpy's David Flodline only giving Snoopy Coaster a better review score than Madcoaster due to him being a fan of the Peanuts franchise.

The gameplay of Snoopy Coaster has been described by critics as simple. Pocket Gamer's Mark Brown felt that the game would keep players "hooked" longer than most other endless runner games, due to its simple premise. AOL's Brandy Shaul attributed the game's supposed simplicity to its easiness, writing that "the game is so simple and easy that it's not unheard of to earn more than 1,000 coins in a single run".

The game's voice lines received mixed reception; Pocket Gamer felt that they were "annoyingly repetitive", while AppSpy praised the voices for giving personality to the game's characters, while still agreeing that they would grow repetitive. AppSpy also praised the game's soundtrack, calling it "amazing".

Critics felt that Snoopy Coaster would be especially enjoyed by Peanuts fans, with David Flodline of AppSpy writing that all of his enjoyment from the game came from his love for the Peanuts intellectual property. AOL, however, felt that players didn't need to be Peanuts fans to enjoy the game due to Snoopy Coaster being a "slower [and] easier game that's perfect for those that are unfamiliar with the [endless running] genre's previously released games".

Snoopy Coaster has been frequently compared to Madcoaster due to the two game's similar gameplay. Pocket Gamer wrote that Snoopy Coaster is "little more than Peanuts-themed remake" of Madcoaster, citing identical design, interface, and objectives.
