= Contre Jour =

2011 video game

- Contre Jour icon
- Developer: Mokus
- Publisher: Chillingo
- Composer: David Ari Leon
- Platforms: Browser, iOS, Windows Phone, Android, Windows 8
- Release: iOS; August 24, 2011
- Genre: Puzzle
- Mode: Single-player

Contre Jour is a physics-based puzzle video game for web browsers, Windows Phone, Blackberry, Android, iOS and Symbian. It was developed in 2011 by Ukrainian developer Mokus and published by Electronic Arts through its label Chillingo. The art for the game Contre Jour was created by artist Mihai Tymoshenko. The soundtrack for Contre Jour was composed by David Ari Leon. The game focuses upon a little blob named Petit, a reference to Le Petit Prince, whose means of locomotion is to be manoeuvered around by manipulating his environment through the various areas of the game using the touch screen.

== Development ==
On 3 November 2011 Contre Jour for iOS was made available through the App Store. A native (HD) version for the iPad was released on the same day. This was followed by the release of a free version with fewer levels for each device on the next day, called Contre Jour Lite. The game won Best Mobile Game of E3 in 2011 by GamePro and reached #1 on App Store sales charts

The art of Contre Jour was created by artist Mihai Tymoshenko. The first concept art sketches for the game were done in two hours. The main character was inspired by the yin-yang. The black character appears in chapters 1–3, the white (blue) one in chapters 2 and 4. All the artwork was finished in six weeks. Over ten versions of the game environment were proposed. The stylistics of the art derive from black-and-white pictures. Animation and visual effects were made by Mokus.

In October 2012, the web version of the game at www.contrejour.ie was launched due to a partnership between the developers and Microsoft. The purpose was to showcase what is possible on the Web with HTML5. Later the web version went down.

== Reception and awards ==
Reception

Aggregate score
Aggregator	Score
Metacritic	80/100 (HD) 93/100

Review score
Publication	Score
TouchArcade	4.5/5

Reviews of Contre Jour were very positive for both the game and the music, among both critics and the game's audience. Blake Sabatinelli of ABC Action News called the game a masterpiece of mobile gaming, saying, "the game is so well designed that it almost feels like you're playing a piece of art," and David Carnoy from CBS News said the game, "has spectacular art design and music, along with creative imagination." In December 2011, Contre Jour HD received the "iPad Game of the Year" award by Apple in their annual "iTunes Rewind." Also in December 2011, Contre Jour was named the "Best Physics" iOS game of the year in Touchgen's Editor's Choice Awards. In March 2012, the game won an Appy Award for "Best Puzzle Game." Also in March 2012, Contre Jour was honored at the International Mobile Game Awards (IMGA) in Barcelona, Spain with the "Jury's Honorable Mention" prize. In April 2012, the game received a Webby Award nomination for "Best Tablet Game.". In September 2012, the game won "Xbox Live Game of the Week". Also in 2012, Time magazine included the title in their list of "25 Best iPad Games for Your New 'Resolutionary' Tablet". During the 15th Annual Interactive Achievement Awards, the Academy of Interactive Arts & Sciences nominated Contre Jour for "Mobile Game of the Year".

== See also ==
- Chiaroscuro
- Backlighting (lighting design)
