= The Killer (2017 film) =

2017 film by Marcelo Galvão

- Film poster
- Directed by: Marcelo Galvão
- Story by: Marcelo Galvão
- Starring: Diogo Morgado; Nill Marcondes; Deto Montenegro; Maria de Medeiros; Étienne Chicot
- Distributed by: Netflix
- Release date: 10 November 2017
- Country: Brazil
- Languages: Portuguese, English, French

The Killer (Portuguese: O Matador) is a 2017 Brazilian western created and directed by Marcelo Galvão, starring Diogo Morgado, Nill Marcondes, Deto Montenegro, Maria de Medeiros and Étienne Chicot.

Principal photography began in August, 2016. The film was distributed by Netflix, premiering on 10 November 2017.

== Plot ==
Set between the 1910s and 1940s, the film follows Shaggy (Diogo Morgado), a feared killer in the state of Pernambuco. Shaggy, raised by a local bandit named Seven Ears (Deto Montenegro) who found him as an abandoned baby, grows up in the wilderness, completely isolated from civilization. Now an adult, he finally goes to town to look for Seven Ears who has disappeared, but instead finds a place ruled by the tyrannical Monsieur Blanchard (Étienne Chicot), a Frenchman who runs the precious stones trade and previously employed Seven Ears as an assassin.

== Cast ==
- Diogo Morgado as Shaggy
- Nill Marcondes
- Deto Montenegro as Seven Ears
- Maria de Medeiros
- Étienne Chicot as Monsieur Blanchard
- Mel Lisboa
- Daniela Galli
- Igor Cotrim
- Thaís Cabral
- Will Roberts as the American bounty hunter Gringo

== Production ==
On August 5, 2016, Netflix announced the film's director, cast, plot and that principal photography on the film would begin in the same month.
