= Peregrinação (film) =

2017 film

- Film poster
- Directed by: João Botelho
- Written by: João Botelho
- Starring: Cláudio da Silva
- Release date: 1 November 2017
- Country: Portugal
- Language: Portuguese

Peregrinação is a 2017 Portuguese drama film directed by João Botelho and based on the 16th-century memoir Pilgrimage (Portuguese: Peregrinação) by Fernão Mendes Pinto. It was selected as the Portuguese entry for the Best Foreign Language Film at the 91st Academy Awards, but it was not nominated.

== Cast ==
- Cláudio da Silva as Fernão Mendes Pinto
- Jani Zhao as Meng
- Catarina Wallenstein as D. Maria Correia de Brito
- Rui Morisson as D. Pedro Silva
- Filipe Vargas as Fidalgo Espanhol

== See also ==
- List of submissions to the 91st Academy Awards for Best Foreign Language Film
- List of Portuguese submissions for the Academy Award for Best International Feature Film
