= Malapata =

2017 Portuguese mystery comedy film by Diogo Morgado

- Film poster
- Directed by: Diogo Morgado
- Written by: Diogo Morgado; Pedro Morgado
- Produced by: Diogo Morgado
- Starring: Rui Unas; Marco Horácio
- Production company: SLX Productions
- Distributed by: Altice Portugal
- Release date: March 16, 2017
- Running time: 83 minutes
- Country: Portugal
- Language: Portuguese

Malapata (English: Bad Luck) is a 2017 Portuguese mystery comedy film directed by Diogo Morgado, co-written by brothers duo Diogo Morgado and Pedro Morgado. The film stars Rui Unas and Marco Horácio in the main lead roles. The film was released on 16 March 2017. The film was mostly shot and set in Algarve.

== Synopsis ==
Two best friends Carlos (Rui Unas) and Artur (Marco Horácio) play the lottery to challenge their luck. The unlikely happens and they eventually become millionaires. Being driven by enthusiasm, they begin to live according to their newfound possibilities experiencing luxuries which they only dreamt of. The worst picture is that they witness the worst day of their lives with constant bad luck and unprecedented unexpected sequence of events.

== Cast ==
- Rui Unas as Carlos
- Marco Horácio as Artur
- Mário Bomba as Chefe
- Diogo Morgado as Barbosa
- Helder Agapito as João
- René Barbosa as Homem da Cela
- Luciana Abreu as Ana
