= Meaningful learning =

Learning methodology

Meaningful learning refers to the act of higher order thinking and development through intellectual engagement that uses pattern recognition and concept association. It can include—but is not limited to—critical and creative thinking, inquiry, problem solving, critical discourse, and metacognitive skills. The concept and theory behind meaningful learning contends that information must be completely understood to such a degree that it can be used to make connections with other previously known knowledge aiding in further understanding. Since information is stored in a network of connections, it can be accessed from multiple starting points depending on the context of recall. Meaningful learning is often contrasted with rote learning, a method in which information is memorized sometimes without elements of understanding or relation to other objects or situations. A real-world example of a concept the learner has learned is an instance of meaningful learning.

== Benefits ==
Utilization of meaningful learning may trigger further learning, as the relation of a concept to a real-world situation may be encouraging to the learner. It may encourage the learner to understand the information presented and will assist with active learning techniques to aid their understanding. Although it takes longer than rote memorization information, it is typically retained for a longer period of time.

== Techniques ==
Meaningful learning can incorporate many different techniques: concept map, collaboration, and hands-on tasks. Some techniques may be more helpful than others depending on the learner.

== Nature of meaningful learning ==
There are many ways to understand and define meaningful learning; it incorporates many facets of cognition. Similar types of learning include active learning, deeper learning, and integrative learning.

Ausubel (1967:10) focused on meaningful learning as "a clearly articulated and precisely differentiated conscious experience that emerges when potentially meaningful signs, symbols, concepts, or propositions are related to and incorporated within a given individual's cognitive structure" (Takač 2008, p. 26).

Shuell (1992) outlined the principles of the meaningful learning process:

1. Active: The learner must cognitively engage with the presented information using an appropriate learning style.
2. Constructive: When information is incorporated into a cognitive structure, it is recreated as a new form showing the learner's own understanding.
3. Cumulative: New information builds upon old information rather than being replaced or stored independently.
4. Self-regulated: Meaningful learning is an independent process. The learner must conduct and regulate their own learning process as well as make decisions on how to organize the mental model.
5. Goal-Oriented: An outcome or expectation should be worked by the learner. Moreover, the goal must be devised individually.

Provided that these principles are followed, information becomes part of a hierarchically organized system in the mind. Within the system, the newly learned information is "anchored" and does not require constant revision to be retained. It is unknown for how long the information can be remembered; however, the duration of retention exceeds that of rote-learned information. Karpicke (2012) suggested that practicing retrieval rather than re-reading the information can strengthen the learner's ability to recall the information in the future.

As a note, there are those who view it as unfair to cluster meaningful learning in with, what some view as indefensible, theories such as learning styles theories (Davis & Francis, 2023).

An individual can display an understanding of the material by paraphrasing, summarizing, answering related questions, and utilizing the material to perform a task.

=== Variables ===
Although anyone can engage in meaningful learning, the extent to which meaningful learning can be achieved depends on a number of mechanisms.

1. Availability of cognitive structures: Learners need to know how to appropriately process new information. Without proper organizational skills, learners cannot build upon past concepts.
2. Stability of concept: It is difficult to understand new, complex concepts when learners do not have a solid foundation of background knowledge. Having a firm understanding of an existing idea will allow learners to integrate new ideas with old ones.
3. Discriminability between concepts: It is much easier to forget superficial concepts than actual meaningful ones. The learning material must clearly define the learning objective so learners will learn only what is important rather than redundant information.
4. Type of learning material: In general, pictorial and literary information is learned much quicker than numerical and nonsense information.
5. Individual differences: There can be many external factors that cause individual differences between learners including age, socioeconomic class, heredity, intelligence quotient, and cognitive style.
6. Prior knowledge or subsumption or anchor idea: This is the relevant knowledge that the individual has in their cognitive structure before obtaining the new knowledge. The meaning of the new knowledge that was learned depends on the existence of knowledge already in the individual's cognitive structure.
7. Applying Knowledge: The individual must be able to relate the new knowledge in a logical and non-literal way to the previous knowledge already in their cognitive structure. The individual needs to be able to relate the new knowledge with the previous knowledge because new knowledge requires meaning to be integrated into the cognitive structure correctly.
8. Relatable meaning: The meaning that the individual attaches to a particular point of knowledge gives it importance. This is because the meaning that is attached to what was learned determines the usefulness for it in their daily life. When a person learns meaningfully, it presents the ability to transfer those meanings to new situations that they face.

=== Advantages ===
Utilizing meaningful learning is beneficial in several ways. When learning new concepts, it is cognitively more easy to attempt to understand the substance of materials than to try to memorize the same information using rote techniques. This is because understanding the information enables longer retention and facilitates greater future learning than rote memorization.

Learners when engaging in meaningful learning spend less time learning large bulks of information compared to learners using rote techniques. This is because it is much easier to continuously build on concepts the learner already understands.

Meaningful learning often helps in developing problem solving skills which are easily transferable to real-life situations.

== Spread of activation ==
If meaningful learning is occurring, then the learner is fully engaged; the brain can then organize the information based on what it relates to; this creates the associations that help us learn more and understand better by making connections. This also means that these facts will be remembered together, instead of individually. Remembering one of the facts (or activation) will prime you to remember the others. This has been termed, Spreading activation. Learners who are able to use this method of learning, as opposed to rote learning, are able to solve problems easier due to their capacity to apply their knowledge. The Internet has been a major factor in meaningful learning. Web 2.0 technologies such as Wikipedia, Blogs, and YouTube, have made learning easier and more accessible for students (Hamdan et al. 2015). Students are able to develop their interests with free and easy access to these online tools; therefore, they are able to learn the material meaningfully. Interest development is one of the goals of meaningful learning, as students who are interested, generally learn more effectively (Heddy et al. 2006).

== Applications ==
Teachers often struggle to promote meaningful learning in the classroom. Ausubel criticized educators for over-relying on teacher-centered instruction, as opposed to student-centered instruction. He argues that students must take responsibility for their learning and actively try to understand the materials presented. Michael (2001) also condemned teachers' reluctance to incorporate meaningful learning in the classroom, saying that they are over-relying on outdated (often rote) teaching techniques rather than using more modern and efficient techniques. There are many scientifically proven ways of fostering meaningful learning in the classroom.

Within the cognitive theory of learning, based on the theory of human information processing, there are 3 core processes of learning: how knowledge is developed, how new knowledge is integrated into an existing cognitive system, and how knowledge becomes automatic.

=== Collaborative discussion ===
Learning in a group setting can foster meaningful learning. People tend to be more engaged in the learning materials and can take advantage of other students' knowledge by integrating it with their own. Furthermore, when explaining a concept to another person, the speaker has to present information more coherently for the listener to understand properly. This process helps to organize the information in the speaker's and listener's minds. Having another person challenge an idea can also aid in meaningful learning. It can result in a stronger understanding of a subject for both parties – information can either be corrected or enhanced through elucidation.

=== Concept maps ===
Concept maps are a useful way of ordering information and showing relationships between concepts. Mapping out information allows students to see the connections between concepts so that individual ideas seem to be part of a larger whole. Studies also found that when students collaborate when making a concept map, they engage in more meaningful learning than making one individually. The reason for this is because more ideas can be generated at once.

=== Use of technology ===
The Internet and other online technologies has been a major factor in meaningful learning. Web 2.0 technologies, such as Wikipedia, Blogs, and YouTube, have made learning easier and more accessible for students (Hamdan et al. 2015). Students are able to develop their interests with free and easy access to these online tools. Therefore, they are able to learn the material meaningfully. Interest development is one of the goals of meaningful learning as students who are interested generally learn more effectively (Heddy et al. 2006). However, internet technologies cannot facilitate meaningful learning on their own. Computers should be treated as a learning support rather than a form of instruction. It is especially important for students to have a sound understanding of an online environment so they can grasp the information being presented. To engage in meaningful learning, students must show a degree of independence and tolerance for uncertainty. In order to support students, they should be given continuous guidance until they understand the task at hand. Online learning environments should be designed to allow for reflection, collaboration, and the contextualization of information.
