= Headway Inc =

Educational technology company

- Type: Private
- Industry: Educational technology, consumer technology
- Founded: 15 January 2019
- Founder: Anton Pavlovsky
- Headquarters: Limassol, Cyprus
- Area served: Worldwide
- Products: Headway, Impulse, Nibble, AddMile, Skillsta
- Number of employees: 500+ (2025)
- Subsidiaries: Headway, Impulse, Nibble, AddMile, Skillsta
- Website: https://www.headway.inc/

Headway Inc is a global technology company that operates in the lifelong learning space. The company develops consumer-facing products such as Headway, Impulse, Nibble, AddMile, and Skillsta.

Previously known as Headway after its flagship product, a book summary app, the company has officially rebranded into Headway Inc, a consumer tech platform. In 2025, Headway Inc ranked 4th in the list of the World's Top EdTech companies by TIME magazine.

== History ==
Headway Inc was founded in January 2019 when a small team led by Anton Pavlovsky launched the Headway book summary app. By October 2020, the Headway app had become the most downloaded book summary app globally. Later on, the company expanded into the broader lifelong learning space. In 2021, the company added the Impulse brain training app to its portfolio. In February 2022, Headway Inc released Nibble, an all‑around knowledge app. By mid‑2022, the Headway app appeared among the top ten revenue‑generating educational apps in the US on App Store and Google Play.

In February 2023, Headway Inc was first named to the GSV 150 list of the world’s leading digital learning companies and then appeared on the list for four consecutive years (2023-2026). Later that year, the Headway app received an App Store Editors' Choice badge in the United States. In December 2023, the company launched the AddMile coaching platform, and in July 2024, Skillsta, a social skills trainer. In 2024, Headway Inc made the Top 100 Next Unicorns list by Viva Technology. In 2024 and 2025, Forbes Ukraine recognized Headway Inc among the Top 3 employers in the country.

For the three consecutive years, 2023-2025, Headway Inc was also spotlighted on the Europe EdTech 200 by HolonIQ, and the list of the Top 50 Contenders, businesses in Europe with the highest potential to get a "unicorn" status by GP Bullhound and Bullhound Capital.

In April 2025, Headway officially rebranded as Headway Inc. That same month, TIME magazine ranked Headway Inc fourth on its list of the World's Top EdTech companies. In spring 2025, the Headway and Impulse apps were also awarded as Honorees by the Webby Awards. In July 2025, the company closed its Series A financing led by Bullhound Capital via its Fund VI, marking the company's first external round and the largest investment through Bullhound Capital's Fund VI to date.

Headway Inc has users in over 170 countries and operates via offices in Madrid, Kyiv, Limassol, Warsaw, and Lviv, along with hybrid team members across the globe.

== Products ==
- Headway, a daily growth app that offers insights from bestselling nonfiction books.
- Impulse, a brain‑training app featuring bite‑sized games and puzzles to improve cognitive skills.
- Nibble, an app that delivers short and interactive lessons across a diverse range of topics.
- AddMile, a personal and professional development platform that helps improve various spheres of life through coaching.
- Skillsta, a social skills trainer that provides short and interactive lessons based on real-life situations.

Additionally, the company develops Headway for Business, a microlearning tool that helps build soft skills to foster team growth. Its corporate roster includes Google, Costco, Cisco, T-Mobile, HubSpot, Amazon, Vodafone, and 600+ others.

The company also has R&D labs and intends to keep releasing a new product every year.
