= 2 Broke Girls season 3 =

Season of television series

2 Broke Girls
- Season 3
- DVD cover
- Starring: Kat Dennings; Beth Behrs; Garrett Morris; Jonathan Kite; Matthew Moy; Jennifer Coolidge
- No. of episodes: 24

Release
- Original network: CBS
- Original release: September 23, 2013 – May 5, 2014

Season chronology
- ← Previous; Season 2 Next → Season 4

The third season of the American television sitcom 2 Broke Girls premiered on CBS on September 23, 2013, and concluded on May 5, 2014. The series was created and executively produced by Michael Patrick King and Whitney Cummings. The season focuses on Max Black, a sarcastic below-the-poverty-line waitress, and Caroline Channing, a disgraced New York socialite turned waitress, as they continue their cupcake business venture, with Max joining a pastry school.

Kat Dennings and Beth Behrs portray the two lead characters of the series, Max Black and Caroline Channing. The main cast is rounded out by actors Garrett Morris, Jonathan Kite, Matthew Moy, and Jennifer Coolidge, who portray Earl, Oleg, Han Lee, and Sophie Kaczynski, respectively.

== Plot ==
Max (Kat Dennings) and sophisticated Caroline (Beth Behrs)—new best friends who met waitressing at the same Brooklyn diner—try to get their cupcake business further off the ground. Following the end of season two, the girls discover a hidden room in the diner—perfect to operate Max’s Homemade Cupcakes out of. Max joins a pastry school this season, as their business continues to slowly grow.

== Cast and characters ==
- Kat Dennings as Max Black
- Beth Behrs as Caroline Channing
- Jonathan Kite as Oleg
- Garrett Morris as Earl
- Matthew Moy as Han
- Jennifer Coolidge as Sophie Kaczynsky

== Production ==
The third season employed a cast of six main actors. Actresses Kat Dennings and Beth Behrs return to portray their respective roles as Max Black, a sarcastic below-the-poverty-line waitress, and Caroline Channing, a former socialite who is bankrupt following her father's arrest for his involvement in a Ponzi scheme. Jonathan Kite, Garrett Morris and Matthew Moy also return as Oleg, a foreign hypersexed cook; Earl, a wise but hip elderly cashier; and Han, the Korean proprietor of the diner where the girls continue to work. Jennifer Coolidge reprises her role of Sophie Kaczynski as part of the main cast for the third season, a Polish cleaning businesswoman who lives in the same building as Max and Caroline. Nick Zano returns as a guest to portray Johnny, a street artist and Max's potential love interest.

== Episodes ==
No. overall	No. in season	Title	Directed by	Written by	Original release date	Prod. code	U.S. viewers (millions)
49	1	"And the Soft Opening"	Don Scardino	Michael Patrick King	September 23, 2013	2J6801	8.88
The night Caroline and Max reopen their cupcake shop in the back room at the diner, a legendary British rock star dies in front of the store, bringing them a windfall as his fans congregate there the next night. However, it also brings them into conflict with Han. Final tally for cupcake business venture: $725
50	2	"And the Kickstarter"	Don Scardino	Michelle Nader	September 30, 2013	2J6802	7.72
After seeing two customers successfully fund an improbable business venture through Kickstarter, Caroline decides to use it to raise money for some new clothes. Tensions over that and Max's new phone lead to a rift between the two. Final tally for cupcake business venture: $1,010
51	3	"And the Kitty Kitty Spank Spank"	Don Scardino	Jhoni Marchinko	October 7, 2013	2J6803	7.26
Max and Caroline temporarily take in a stray cat, only to learn after releasing it that someone else has been looking for it. Final tally for cupcake business venture: $1,310
52	4	"And the Group Head"	Don Scardino	Liz Feldman	October 14, 2013	2J6804	7.99
Max and Caroline get a cappuccino machine for their business, but their inability to operate it leads them to get a job at Starbucks. Federico Dordei joins the cast as the new day waiter, Luis. Final tally for cupcake business venture: $1,512
53	5	"And the Cronuts"	Don Scardino	Sonny Lee & Patrick Walsh	October 21, 2013	2J6805	7.36
Seeing the success of cronuts, and fearing that they may displace cupcakes in popularity, Max and Caroline attempt to add them to their cupcake shop's product line. Final tally for cupcake business venture: $2,012
54	6	"And the Piece of Sheet"	Don Scardino	Liz Astrof	October 28, 2013	2J6806	7.71
Caroline's gift of new sheets to Max goes awry when she gives Max's childhood pillowcase to charity and cannot recover it. Final tally for cupcake business venture: $2,162
55	7	"And the Girlfriend Experience"	Don Scardino	Morgan Murphy	November 4, 2013	2J6807	8.12
Han lies in an email to his mother when he sends her pictures of a prostitute, saying she is his girlfriend. With his mother due to arrive from Korea, Han pays Max and Caroline to find the girl and convince her to pretend to be his girlfriend. Final tally for cupcake business venture: $2,280
56	8	"And the 'It' Hole"	Don Scardino	Whitney Cummings	November 11, 2013	2J6808	8.23
Caroline is anxious for a date with a surfer guy, but she becomes confused when she is stood up for the first time ever. Even after being stood up, Caroline and Max go to the exclusive restaurant Caroline's date got reservations for. Final tally for cupcake business venture: $2,420
57	9	"And the Pastry Porn"	Don Scardino	Charles Brottmiller	November 18, 2013	2J6809	7.92
The girls hire Sophie's cleaning business to clean their apartment, and Caroline convinces Max to apply to the Manhattan School of Pastry. Gilles Marini's first appearance as pastry school head chef, and Caroline's love interest, Nicholas. Final tally for cupcake business venture: $2.50
58	10	"And the First Day of School"	Don Scardino	Michael Patrick King	November 25, 2013	2J6810	7.82
On her first day of pastry school, Max befriends the class-clown, while Caroline hopes to impress Max's instructor. Eric André's first appearance as class-clown, and Max's love interest, Deke. Final tally for cupcake business venture: $114.50
59	11	"And the Life After Death"	Don Scardino	Molly McAleer	December 2, 2013	2J6811	8.48
Caroline finds the obituary of her childhood nanny in the paper, so she and Max go to the funeral, where almost nobody recognizes Caroline. Final tally for cupcake business venture: $77
60	12	"And the French Kiss"	Don Scardino	Michelle Nader	December 16, 2013	2J6812	7.59
Caroline enjoys a blossoming romance with Chef Nicholas, her boss at the pastry school, until she makes an unsettling discovery about him. Final tally for cupcake business venture: $220
61	13	"And the Big But"	Don Scardino	Liz Feldman	January 13, 2014	2J6813	8.95
Max realizes while studying for a test with Deke that their friendship may be something stronger. Meanwhile, Caroline is bothered by her continued strong feelings for Chef Nicholas, despite finding out that he is married. Final tally for cupcake business venture: $252.75
62	14	"And the Dumpster Sex"	Don Scardino	Liz Astrof	January 20, 2014	2J6814	9.03
When Deke takes Max to his place after a great first date, his "home" is nothing like she expected. Meanwhile, Caroline feels empowered – then scared for her life – after having a shady car towed from the front of their cupcake window. Final tally for cupcake business venture: $410
63	15	"And the Icing on the Cake"	Phill Lewis	Sonny Lee & Patrick Walsh	January 27, 2014	2J6815	10.05
Caroline discovers that Deke and his family are multi-millionaires, which complicates Max's relationship with him. Final tally for cupcake business venture: $560
64	16	"And the ATM"	Phill Lewis	Charles Brottmiller	February 3, 2014	2J6816	9.22
Max rebuffs Deke's efforts to show her that his wealth should not change how she sees him, but she temporarily loses her way when he gifts her $1,000,000. Final tally for cupcake business venture: $560 (for a few seconds, the tally is $1,000,560)
65	17	"And the Married Man Sleepover"	Phill Lewis	Whitney Cummings	February 24, 2014	2J6817	7.96
Nicholas' wife gives Caroline permission to sleep with him via Skype, putting Caroline in a difficult situation as she no longer has any excuses not to. Max and Deke contemplate whether to take their relationship to the next level and start using contraceptives regularly. Final tally for cupcake business venture: $840
66	18	"And the Near Death Experience"	Phill Lewis	Liz Feldman	March 3, 2014	2J6818	8.44
Nicholas tells Caroline he intends to leave his wife for her, and that she is coming to New York so he can tell her personally. Caroline's efforts to break off the relationship grow more desperate. Gilles Marini's last appearance as Nicholas. Final tally for cupcake business venture: $824
67	19	"And the Kilt Trip"	Phill Lewis	Molly McAleer & Morgan Murphy	March 17, 2014	2J6819	7.21
Caroline goes out with Max and the diner gang who want to get wild and crazy at the St. Patrick's Day Parade. Final tally for cupcake business venture: $1,150
68	20	"And the Not Broke Parents"	Phill Lewis	Michael Patrick King	March 24, 2014	2J6820	7.40
When Nicholas returns to France with his wife, the pastry school is shut down. Deke offers to buy it but needs to get the money from his parents. When Deke asks Caroline and Max to join him and his parents for a dinner, his mother shares a secret with Max. Eric Andre's last appearance as Deke. Final tally for cupcake business venture: $2,850
69	21	"And the Wedding Cake Cake Cake"	Jean Sagal	Michelle Nader & Liz Astrof	April 14, 2014	2J6821	7.22
Three days before her wedding, a customer at the cupcake stand (Lindsay Lohan) hires the girls to do a new wedding cake for her. However, she regularly changes her mind about what she wants and does not want. Final tally for cupcake business venture: $2,650
70	22	"And the New Lease on Life"	Phill Lewis	Sonny Lee & Patrick Walsh	April 21, 2014	2J6822	7.10
When Max and Caroline learn the lease on their rent-controlled apartment needs to be renewed, they have to find the original tenant, as their names are not on the lease. They find the tenant, Lester (Hal Linden), at a retirement community. He goes to his old apartment and signs a new four-year lease, then refuses to leave until the girls convince Sophie to have sex with him. Sophie staunchly declines, prompting Max and Caroline to choose between moving out or having sex with Lester. Final tally for cupcake business venture: $2,614
71	23	"And the Free Money"	Phill Lewis	Charles Brottmiller	April 28, 2014	2J6823	7.76
Caroline's love for horse racing gets out of hand when she and Max go to a racetrack as guests of Sophie's new bookie boyfriend. The two girls initially turn $200 into $600, but Caroline bets on more races to run up debts of $3,000. Things get worse when Sophie breaks up with the bookie, forcing Earl to briefly end his self-imposed moratorium on gambling in order to get Caroline out of the hole. Final tally for cupcake business venture: $2,814
72	24	"And the First Degree"	Phill Lewis	Morgan Murphy	May 5, 2014	2J6824	6.49
Caroline discovers that Max only needs to make up a final exam in American history to earn her high school diploma. She helps Max study for it, and the two take a bus trip to Max's old school in Rhode Island for the test. Caroline is angered by Max's mom being as worthless as Max said she was, but Max finds genuine joy in having a group of people in her life who love her and whom she loves--yes, even Han. Final tally for cupcake business venture: $2,572

== Ratings ==
Viewership and ratings per episode of 2 Broke Girls season 3
No.	Title	Air date	Rating/share (18–49)	Viewers (millions)
1	"And the Soft Opening"	September 23, 2013	2.8/7	8.88
2	"And the Kickstarter"	September 30, 2013	2.4/6	7.72
3	"And the Kitty Kitty Spank Spank"	October 7, 2013	2.3/6	7.26
4	"And the Group Head"	October 14, 2013	2.6/7	7.99
5	"And the Cronuts"	October 21, 2013	2.5/7	7.36
6	"And the Piece of Sheet"	October 28, 2013	2.7/7	7.71
7	"And the Girlfriend Experience"	November 4, 2013	2.6/7	8.12
8	"And the 'It' Hole"	November 11, 2013	2.7/7	8.23
9	"And The Pastry Porn"	November 18, 2013	2.7/7	7.92
10	"And The First Day Of School"	November 25, 2013	2.7/7	7.82
11	"And the Life After Death"	December 2, 2013	2.7/7	8.48
12	"And the French Kiss"	December 16, 2013	2.3/7	7.59
13	"And the Big But"	January 13, 2014	2.7/7	8.95
14	"And the Dumpster Sex"	January 20, 2014	2.7/7	9.03
15	"And the Icing on the Cake"	January 27, 2014	3.0/8	10.05
16	"And The ATM"	February 3, 2014	3.0/8	9.22
17	"And the Married Man Sleepover"	February 24, 2014	2.5/7	7.96
18	"And the Near Death Experience"	March 3, 2014	2.6/7	8.44
19	" And the Kilt Trip"	March 17, 2014	2.2/6	7.21
20	"And the Not Broke Parents"	March 24, 2014	2.3/7	7.40
21	"And the Wedding Cake Cake Cake"	April 14, 2014	2.3/7	7.22
22	"And the New Lease on Life"	April 21, 2014	2.1/7	7.10
23	"And the Free Money"	April 28, 2014	2.3/7	7.76
24	"And the First Degree"	May 5, 2014	2.0/7	6.49
