= 2 Broke Girls season 1 =

Season of television series

2 Broke Girls
- Season 1
- DVD cover
- Starring: Kat Dennings; Beth Behrs; Garrett Morris; Jonathan Kite; Matthew Moy
- No. of episodes: 23

Release
- Original network: CBS
- Original release: September 19, 2011 – May 7, 2012

Season chronology
- Next → Season 2

The first season of the American television sitcom 2 Broke Girls premiered on CBS from September 19, 2011, and concluded on May 7, 2012. The series was created and executively produced by Michael Patrick King and Whitney Cummings. 2 Broke Girls' first season aired during the 2011–12 television season on Mondays at 8:30 p.m. EST, except the series premiere. While initial reviews were positive, the season garnered mixed reviews from television critics, who praised the lead actresses' chemistry while panning the use of stereotypes and racial content. The season premiere debuted to 19.37 million viewers, the highest series launch on CBS since Fall 2001. The season averaged 11.27 million viewers per 24 episodes. Season one earned several award nominations and won two awards: An Emmy Award for Outstanding Art Direction for a Multi-Camera Series and a People's Choice Award for Favorite New TV Comedy. The entire season was released on DVD in Region 1 on September 4, 2012, Region 2 on October 22, 2012, and Region 4 on October 17, 2012.

== Premise ==
The season introduces Max Black, a sarcastic below-the-poverty-line waitress, and Caroline Channing, a disgraced New York socialite turned waitress, who both pool their money together to pay for their future cupcake business. Kat Dennings and Beth Behrs portray the two lead characters of the series, Max Black and Caroline Channing. The main cast is rounded out by actors Garrett Morris, Jonathan Kite, Matthew Moy, and Jennifer Coolidge, who portray Earl, Oleg, Han Lee, and Sophie Kaczynski.

== Development and production ==
Creator Michael Patrick King had worked on several network series before the HBO television series Sex and the City (1998–2004). Initially starting out as a writer, he went on to direct and produce episodes for the series as well as write, produce and direct the two films that followed – Sex and the City and Sex and the City 2. After finalizing the last film to the series, King entered a multi-year deal with Warner Bros. Television, through which he formed his production company, Michael Patrick King Productions. In that year, a bidding war occurred for the undeveloped pilot to 2 Broke Girls. In December, the series' pilot was picked up by CBS. The series was then ordered on May 13, 2011, for the 2011-2012 primetime television season. The series received a full-season pickup on October 5, 2011. In March 2012, the series was renewed for a second season.

The season was produced by Michael Patrick King Productions and Warner Bros. Television and executive produced by creators Michael Patrick King and comedian Whitney Cummings. The season featured writing from King, Cummings, David Feeney, Liz Feldman, Sonny Lee, Dave Mallins, Jhoni Marchinko, Molly McAleer, comedian Morgan Murphy, Michelle Nader, and Patrick Walsh. Directors hired for the season were James Burrows, Scott Ellis, John Fortenberry, Thomas Kail, Julie Anne Robinson (serving as associate director), actor Fred Savage, actress Jean Sagal, and actor Ted Wass. Ellis and Wass directed a majority of the season's episodes. Feldman, Tim Kaiser, Lee and Walsh also served as the series' producers. Series writers Malins, Marchinko, and Nader, along with Laura Kightlinger, served as the series consulting producers. Cinematography for the series was headed by Chris La Fountaine, with Gary Baum and Joseph W. Calloway directing photography for one episode each.

== Cast and characters ==
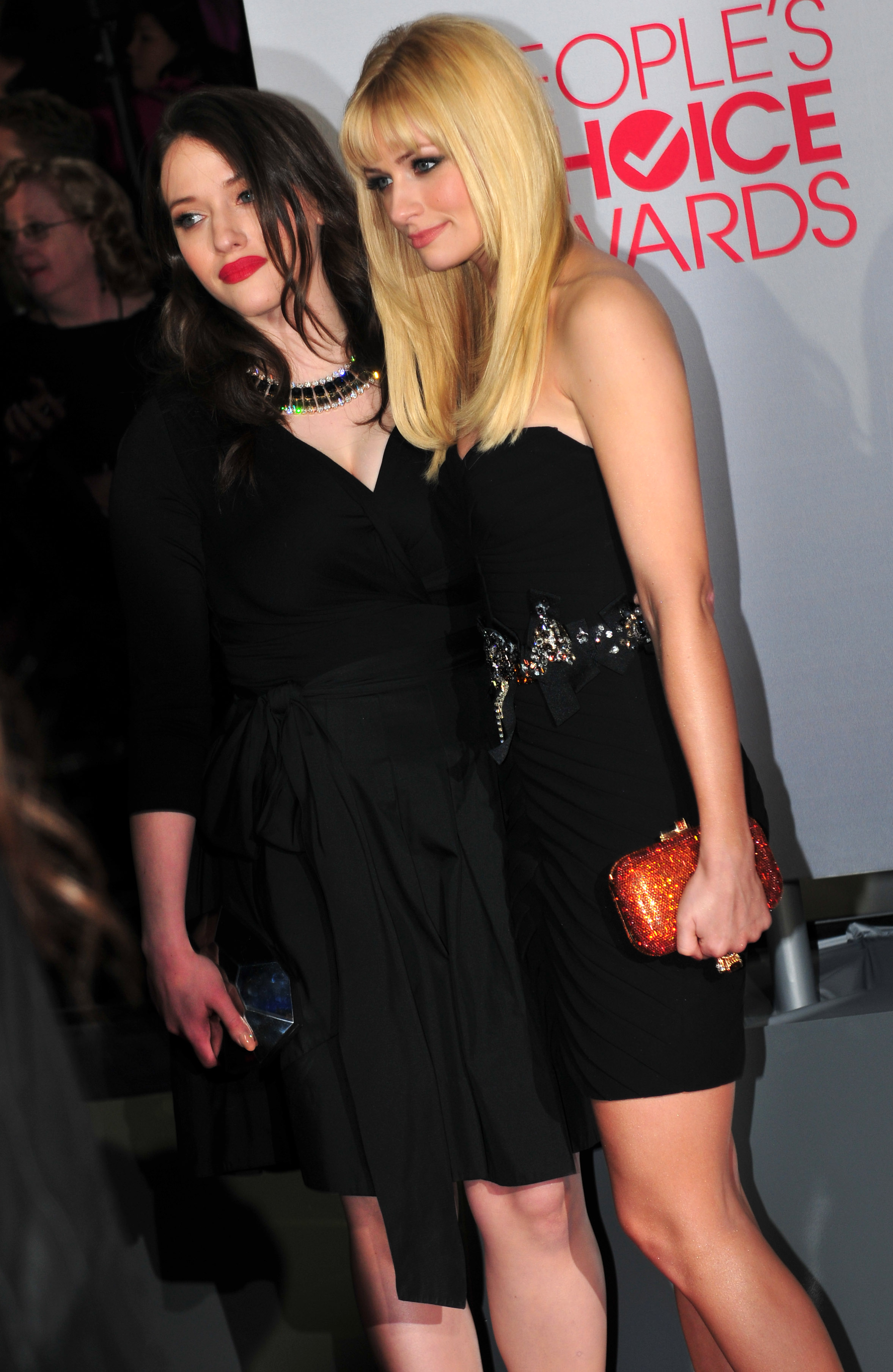
Dennings and Behrs were the first actors cast in the series

The first season employed a cast a five main actors. Actresses Kat Dennings and Beth Behrs were the first to be cast in the series as Max Black, a sarcastic below-the-poverty-line waitress, and Caroline Channing, a former socialite who is bankrupt following her father's arrest for his involvement in a Ponzi scheme. Jonathan Kite, Garrett Morris and Matthew Moy were later cast as Oleg, a foreign hypersexed cook; Earl, a wise but hip elderly cashier; and Han, the Korean proprietor of the diner.

Season one introduced a few characters that recurred throughout the season as well as several guest stars. Jennifer Coolidge portrayed Sophie Kaczynski, a Polish cleaning businesswoman who moves into the building where Max and Caroline live, beginning in the episode "And the Upstairs Neighbor". She was later upgraded to series regular in the next season. Nick Zano portrayed Johnny, a street artist and Max's potential love interest. Brooke Lyons played Peaches Landis, a wealthy clueless mother who hires Max as her babysitter of her twins. Marsha Thomason appeared in the season as Johnny's British girlfriend and Max's romantic rival Cashandra. Brian Gross and Greg Worswick appeared in two episodes of the season as a gay couple Steven and Michael. Noah Mills played Robbie, Max's ex-boyfriend in two episodes. Businesswoman Martha Stewart appeared in the season finale as herself. Jayson Blair, who starred in the MTV series The Hard Times of RJ Berger, starred in "And the Spring Break" as Brendon, a tenant in the apartment that Max and Caroline are housesitting for. Stand-up comedian Eddie Pepitone appeared in "And Hoarder Culture" as the voice of the hoarder that Max and Caroline help out.

== Reception ==
=== Viewership and ratings ===
The pilot for 2 Broke Girls premiered in the United States on September 19, 2011 to 19.37 million viewers. The series premiere followed the season nine premiere of Two and a Half Men with Ashton Kutcher replacing Charlie Sheen, which premiered to 28 million viewers. The series premiere was the highest rated comedy series launch since fall 2001. The season ended with a 2 part episode "And Martha Stewart Have a Ball", which drew in 8.99 million viewers. The season averaged 11.29 million viewers per 24 episode, ranking No. 32 among the most watched primetime television series. The season also averaged 5.56 million viewers per 24 episodes within the target demographic, registering a 4.35/11 Nielsen ratings share and ranking as the eleventh highest rated program of the 2011-2012 primetime television season.

=== Critical reviews ===
The first season was well received by media critics. At Metacritic, a site which assigns a normalized rating out of 100 to reviews from media critics, the season received an average score of 66, indicating "generally favorable" reviews, based on initial reviews of the pilot episode. Reviews of the full season became more polarized, with the criticism towards the show's usage of racial stereotypes.

Matt Hinrichs from DVD Talk wrote that the season release is "highly recommended." He deemed the first season "a snarky delight that crackles with hilarious situations and proudly non-p.c. characters." Hinrichs also praised actresses Dennings and Behrs for their portrayal of Max and Caroline, highlighting the chemistry between them and the characters themselves as the series' "winning formula." The Numbers writer C.S. Strowbridge positively received the season, praising the chemistry between the two leads and the character development of several of the main characters while noting that "calling it crass would be an understatement." Strowbridge concluded, "the style of humor will turn off as many people as it entertains and that is an issue. I do think Season One got better as it went along and even though the DVD and the Blu-ray do not have a lot of extras, it is still worth picking up." Todd Fuller of Sitcoms Online wrote that the series is "an old fashioned sitcom like Laverne & Shirley and Alice. It works on many levels. The writing is a bit edgy and raunchy at times, but that's the trend in many comedies these days. Kat Dennings and Beth Behrs have great chemistry and comic timing together. The supporting cast at the diner is pretty funny in small doses. Jennifer Coolidge was also a welcome later addition to the cast."

Emily Nussbaum of The New Yorker wrote a mixed review of the series. Favoring it over Cumming's series on NBC, Nussbaum praised the character Max as something new for network television, highlighting her sense of humor and her contrasting nature to that of Whitney's lead character. However, she was critical of the racial stereotypes present in the series and the series' setting. Nussbaum positively concluded, "there's so much potential here it kills me—a deep female friendship, raw humor about class, and a show that puts young women's sexuality dead center, rather than using it as visual spice, as in some cable series about bad-boy antiheroes." The A.V. Club writer Emily VanDerWerff, in her review of the series finale, was critical of the series for not living up to the potential present in the series' pilot episode and noted that "still hasn't figured out how to use the ensemble, though at least it doesn't seem to have something out for all of the male supporting characters." Patrick Bromley of DVD Verdict praised the lead actresses' chemistry but ultimately found it "repetitive, broad, grating and, more often than not, just stupid." Browley was also critical of the racial content and stereotypes present in the series. Aaron Peck, writing for High-Def Digest, wrote the first season release as "one to avoid." Deeming the season "pure comedic blasphemy", Peck panned the comedic content and use of stereotyping and racism, deeming the characters alongside Max and Caroline "the most racially insensitive depictions" thought up.

=== Awards and nominations ===
In 2012, the series won the People's Choice Award for Favorite New TV Comedy. Crew members Glenda Rovello, Conny Boettger and Amy Feldman were nominated for Excellence in Production Design Award for Episode of a Multi-Camera, Variety, or Unscripted Series for the work on the episode And the Rich People Problems". At the 2012 Teen Choice Awards, 2 Broke Girls was nominated for Choice TV: Comedy while series star Beth Behrs was nominated for Choice TV Breakout Performance – Female. At the 65th Primetime Emmy Awards, Rovello and Feldman won the award for Outstanding Art Direction for a Multi-Camera Series while cinematographer Gary Baum was nominated for Outstanding Cinematography for a Multi-Camera Series and series editor Darryl Bates for Outstanding Multi-Camera Picture Editing for a Comedy Series.

== Episodes ==
No. overall	No. in season	Title	Directed by	Written by	Original release date	Prod. code	U.S. viewers (millions)
1	1	"Pilot"	James Burrows	Michael Patrick King and Whitney Cummings	September 19, 2011	296793	19.37
Russian waitress Paulina is fired from the diner by new Korean boss Han after she had sex at work. African-American cashier Earl is celebrating his 75th birthday. Max, a hardworking waitress, soon finds herself helping out Paulina's replacement Caroline, who until recently was very wealthy, but has been left with nothing after her father was sent to prison. Caroline is homeless, so Max invites her to be her roommate. Their new friendship is in jeopardy when Max's boyfriend Robbie (Noah Mills) hits on Caroline, and she suggests that Max split up with him. Max takes her advice; Caroline moves into Max's apartment and Caroline's horse, Chestnut, moves into Max's yard. Final tally for cupcake business venture: $387.25
2	2	"And the Break-up Scene"	James Burrows	Michael Patrick King	September 26, 2011	2J6352	11.75
Caroline thinks she is doing Max a favor when she takes it upon herself to facilitate her breakup with Robbie. This leads to an increasing dispute over boundaries that threatens to end their new friendship. However, in the end, a very drunk Caroline apologizes to Max and they fall asleep together. Final tally for cupcake business venture: $364.25
3	3	"And Strokes of Goodwill"	John Fortenberry	Jhoni Marchinko	October 3, 2011	2J6353	11.42
Max takes Caroline thrift shopping. After seeing a shirt stolen from Max's basket worn by another woman, Caroline persists in standing up for Max despite her indifference, and the two try to reconcile their different notions of what girlfriends do and do not do for each other. A struggling street artist, Johnny, catches Max's attention with his similarly sarcastic sense of humor. Final tally for cupcake business venture: $500.25
4	4	"And the Rich People Problems"	John Fortenberry	Michelle Nader	October 10, 2011	2J6354	10.71
Max is for once overwhelmed and impressed when she sees how Caroline once lived when the two break into her old townhouse to retrieve her bite-guard. She insists on staying to enjoy the bath, and begins to realize that despite their very different upbringings, Caroline has some things in common with her. They steal several coats and handbags from the house. At the diner, Han installs a karaoke machine, much to Max's disliking. Final tally for cupcake business venture: $543.25
5	5	"And the '90s Horse Party"	Scott Ellis	Sonny Lee and Patrick Walsh	October 17, 2011	2J6355	11.47
After discovering how many debts Max is dodging, Caroline resolves to clean up her roommate's credit by repaying a student loan that Max will not reveal in what it is majored. Max later tells Caroline that she studied art. They host a 1990s-themed party at the diner after they discover that hipsters will pay a lot of money to ride Chestnut. Caroline's ex-boyfriend shows up, so she hides from him in order to prevent him to know that she is now poor. Final tally for cupcake business venture: $593.25
6	6	"And the Disappearing Bed"	Scott Ellis	Greg Malins	October 24, 2011	2J6356	11.19
Different events test Caroline and Max's ability to do things for themselves. Caroline had solicited Johnny to help her assemble a Murphy bed she got for the apartment, but Max challenges her to do it herself so that she can follow up on a "weird" interaction between herself and Johnny at the diner. Max herself tries to work up the courage to give Peach a business card for the cupcake business. Final tally for cupcake business venture: $423.25
7	7	"And the Pretty Problem"	Scott Ellis	David Feeney	October 31, 2011	2J6357	10.97
When Caroline's effort to sell cupcakes to a trendy new coffee shop in the neighborhood fails after the owner says they are not pretty enough, she persuades Max to take a cupcake-decorating class. Max, however, is despondent over her ability to meet the standards of the obnoxious instructors. The girls get their first job after a gay couple see Max's insulting cupcake idea. Final tally for cupcake business venture: $383.25
8	8	"And Hoarder Culture"	Ted Wass	Liz Feldman	November 7, 2011	2J6358	11.43
Max and Caroline take a job cleaning a hoarder's apartment for the extra money and find items they can sell. While out with Johnny spray painting a billboard, Max tries to kiss him but is unsuccessful. Later, on the street, she runs into him with a woman named Cashandra ("Cash"), whom he introduces as his girlfriend. Final tally for cupcake business venture: $623.25
9	9	"And the Really Petty Cash"	Ted Wass	Morgan Murphy	November 14, 2011	2J6359	11.77
Johnny apologizes to Max for not telling her about his girlfriend, but Max is despondent nonetheless. Cash then hires Max and Caroline to make cupcakes for an art show at which Johnny's painting of he and Max in a passionate embrace is among the works shown. The two soon realize that Cashandra is trying to make a point to Max and must choose between their money and their dignity. Final tally for cupcake business venture: $623.25
10	10	"And the Very Christmas Thanksgiving"	Jean Sagal	Michael Patrick King	November 21, 2011	2J6360	11.33
Caroline and Max spend Caroline's first broke holiday season working as elves at a department store's Santaland to earn extra money. Max is initially cynical about Christmas, while Caroline, filled with happy childhood memories, is enthusiastic. However, when her hopes of seeing her father are dashed, and Max is unexpectedly promoted to playing Mrs. Claus, their viewpoints change. Final tally for cupcake business venture: $621.25
11	11	"And the Reality Check"	Fred Savage	Molly McAleer	December 5, 2011	2J6361	12.75
With winter approaching, Max persuades Caroline that Chestnut cannot live in their backyard anymore. However, Caroline balks at her plan to persuade Peach to adopt Chestnut, since it is part of Peach's scheme to be cast in The Real Housewives of TriBeCa. Final tally for cupcake business venture: $621.25
12	12	"And the Pop-Up Sale"	Fred Savage	Michelle Nader	December 12, 2011	2J6362	12.50
After Max and Caroline struggle to light the pilot light of their oven, Caroline tries to raise money for a new one by selling her jewelry, first at the cash-for-gold store and then at the upscale jewelry stores she once frequented. Encountering hostility from a clerk who remembers Caroline all too well, the pair decide the best option is a pop-up sale in the women's bathroom. Caroline abandons Max there with some wealthy Arab women when some of her former friends recognize her and ask her to lunch, severely testing Max and Caroline's friendship. Final tally for cupcake business venture: $621.25
13	13	"And the Secret Ingredient"	Julie Anne Robinson	Michael Patrick King	January 2, 2012	2J6363	12.10
Max starts a protest when Han triples the price of tampons in the diner's restroom. Caroline discovers the secret ingredient to Max's cupcakes and develops a new obsession: couponing. Final tally for cupcake business venture: $644.25
14	14	"And the Upstairs Neighbor"	Thomas Kail	Michael Patrick King	January 16, 2012	2J6364	11.40
Max and Caroline are suspicious of the new upstairs neighbor, Sophie (Jennifer Coolidge), who moves in after the previous tenant dies. Their attempts to make friends with her backfire, and they fear that she will report them to the landlord as illegal sub-letters. They start to believe that Sophie could be a prostitute. Final tally for cupcake business venture: $665.00
15	15	"And the Blind Spot"	Ted Wass	Michelle Nader	February 6, 2012	2J6365	11.47
Sophie tests Max and Caroline to see if they are adept enough to work as maids for her cleaning business. She is impressed by Max but not Caroline, and suggests privately to Max that Caroline is holding her back and she should let go of her. Max resists the suggestion at first, but when Caroline carelessly ruins a batch of cupcakes, Max finds herself wondering if Sophie has a point. Final tally for cupcake business venture: $865.00
16	16	"And the Broken Hearts"	Ted Wass	David Feeney	February 13, 2012	2J6366	10.48
Caroline and Max find themselves spending Valentine's Day in the emergency room when Earl has a heart attack, after being overwhelmed by Sophie's beauty. While there, Caroline attempts to rekindle an old relationship unsuccessfully. Final tally for cupcake business venture: $865.00
17	17	"And the Kosher Cupcakes"	Scott Ellis	Liz Feldman	February 20, 2012	2J6367	11.37
Max and Caroline have to make kosher cupcakes for an Orthodox Jewish family's bar mitzvah. Meanwhile, Caroline worries she might be getting sick, since she lacks the resources she used to have to deal with health problems. Caroline is harassed by the boy having the bar mitzvah and his friend who treat her like a prostitute. Final tally for cupcake business venture: $865.00
18	18	"And the One-Night Stands"	Scott Ellis	Sonny Lee and Patrick Walsh	February 27, 2012	2J6368	10.18
After a surprise birthday party for Caroline bombs, Max runs into an ex-boyfriend when she accompanies Caroline to visit her father in jail. The girls make some friends on the prison bus. Final tally for cupcake business venture: $625.00
19	19	"And the Spring Break"	Scott Ellis	Morgan Murphy	March 19, 2012	2J6369	9.38
Max and Caroline take a spring getaway dog-sitting at a gay couple's posh apartment. A series of parties tempts Caroline with reminders of her former life. Max starts a relationship with a bacon baker man and Ashley, Caroline's spring break alter ego, flirts with a beer brewer. Max develops a new flavor cupcake, beer batter maple bacon. Final tally for cupcake business venture: $775.00
20	20	"And the Drug Money"	Ted Wass	Greg Malins	April 9, 2012	2J6370	8.78
Caroline's old family lawyer stops by to inform her she is being deposed by the prosecution in her father's case. Since he cannot represent her for free, Max convinces Caroline to partake in a clinical drug trial in an effort to raise money for his fee. The side effects from the drug ruin her appointment with the lawyer. Final tally for cupcake business venture: $675.00
21	21	"And the Messy Purse Smackdown"	Ted Wass	Molly McAleer	April 16, 2012	2J6371	8.52
After Caroline helps Earl save money on his taxes, Max asks her roommate to help her. Caroline does, but discovers that Max has never filed a tax return. Her efforts to help Max organize her finances put the two at odds, and risk of missing the midnight deadline. Final tally for cupcake business venture: $675.00
22	22	"And the Big Buttercream Breakthrough"	Ted Wass	Michelle Nader	April 30, 2012	2J6372	9.24
Max and Caroline must deliver perfect cupcakes to Peach's socialite friends if Max wants to keep her babysitting job. However, they get ruined after a subway delay, and Max must make some choices about her future. Final tally for cupcake business venture: $675.00
23	23	"And Martha Stewart Have a Ball: Parts 1 & 2"	Ted Wass	Michael Patrick King	May 7, 2012	2J6373	8.99
24	24	"And Martha Stewart Have a Ball: Parts 1 & 2"	Ted Wass	Michael Patrick King	May 7, 2012	2J6374	8.99
A major opportunity for Max and Caroline falls through when her father's move to a new prison brings her story into the news again. Caroline lies in bed depressed until Max brings Chestnut to cheer her up. After learning Martha Stewart will be attending the Met Ball, they concoct a scheme to get her to try their cupcakes. Max's mood is then affected when Johnny, whose art has become more successful, comes into the diner to say goodbye to her as he is moving to Manhattan and getting married. Sophie takes the girls dress shopping. Final tally for cupcake business venture: $922.00 After Sophie helps them get proper evening clothing, the girls are forced to ride Chestnut to the ball when Oleg's car breaks down. They are stymied by the same party planner who rejected them in Part 1, as Caroline is not on the list. Max, however, comes up with a plan to sneak in. Han reveals that he used to be a jockey. Final tally for cupcake business venture: $927.00

== Ratings ==
=== United States ratings ===
No. in series	No. in season	Episode	Air date	Rating	Share	Viewers (millions)	Weekly rank (18-49 rating)	Weekly rank (viewers)
1	1	Pilot	September 19, 2011	7.1	16	19.37	3	4
2	2	And the Break-up Scene	September 26, 2011	4.6	12	11.75	7	19
3	3	And the Strokes of Goodwill	October 3, 2011	4.5	11	11.42	8	20
4	4	And the Rich People Problems	October 10, 2011	4.3	11	10.71	7	22
5	5	And the '90s Horse Party	October 17, 2011	4.4	11	11.47	6	20
6	6	And the Disappearing Bed	October 24, 2011	4.5	11	11.19	8	23
7	7	And the Pretty Problem	October 31, 2011	4.3	12	10.97	9	—N/a
8	8	And Hoarder Culture	November 7, 2011	4.6	11	11.43	7	16
9	9	And the Really Petty Cash	November 14, 2011	4.8	12	11.77	6	17
10	10	And the Very Christmas Thanksgiving	November 21, 2011	4.6	12	11.33	4	12
11	11	And the Reality Check	December 5, 2011	4.6	11	12.75	7	8
12	12	And the Pop-Up Sale	December 12, 2011	4.2	11	12.50	4	11
13	13	And the Secret Ingredient	January 2, 2012	4.4	10	12.10	7	9
14	14	And the Upstairs Neighbor	January 16, 2012	4.6	11	11.40	7	16
15	15	And the Blind Spot	February 6, 2012	4.3	11	11.47	7	16
16	16	And the Broken Hearts	February 13, 2012	3.8	10	10.48	8	20
17	17	And the Kosher Cupcakes	February 20, 2012	4.0	10	11.37	10	17
18	18	And the One-Night Stands	February 27, 2012	3.8	10	10.18	8	19
19	19	And the Spring Break	March 19, 2012	3.5	10	9.38	8	—N/a
20	20	And the Drug Money	April 9, 2012	3.5	10	8.78	7	—N/a
21	21	And the Messy Purse Smackdown	April 16, 2012	3.4	9	8.52	6	22
22	22	And the Big Buttercream Breakthrough	April 30, 2012	3.6	10	9.24	6	23
23	23	And Martha Stewart Have a Ball (Part 1)	May 7, 2012	3.3	10	8.99	22	—N/a
24	24	And Martha Stewart Have a Ball (Part 2)	May 7, 2012	3.3	10	8.99	10	—N/a

=== United Kingdom ratings ===
All viewing figures and ranks are sourced from BARB.

No. in series	No. in season	Episode title	Air date	E4 Viewers (million)	E4 Rank	Rank (cable)	E4 +1 viewers (million)	Total viewers (million)
1	1	Pilot	April 19, 2012	1.16	3	3	0.30	1.46
2	2	And the Break-up Scene	April 26, 2012	0.91	3	3	0.33	1.24
3	3	And the Goodwill	May 3, 2012	0.75	3	3	0.46	1.21
4	4	And the Rich People Problems	May 10, 2012	0.78	4	4	0.34	1.12
5	5	And the '90s Horse Party	May 17, 2012	0.69	4	4	0.29	0.98
6	6	And the Disappearing Bed	May 24, 2012	0.70	4	4	0.33	1.03
7	7	And the Pretty Problem	May 31, 2012	0.64	6	6	0.44	1.08
8	8	And Hoarder Culture	June 7, 2012	0.67	4	4	0.32	0.99
9	9	And the Really Petty Cash	June 14, 2012	0.67	3	3	0.42	1.09
10	10	And the Very Christmas Thanksgiving	June 21, 2012	0.65	4	4	0.35	1.00
11	11	And the Reality Check	June 28, 2012	0.54	8	8	0.29	0.83
12	12	And the Pop-Up Sale	July 5, 2012	0.79	3	3	0.34	1.13
13	13	And the Secret Ingredient	July 12, 2012	0.68	7	7	0.26	0.94
14	14	And the Upstairs Neighbor	July 19, 2012	0.62	6	6	0.25	0.87
15	15	And the Blindspot	July 26, 2012	0.68	3	3	—N/a	0.68
16	16	And the Broken Hearts	August 2, 2012	0.53	4	4	0.27	0.80
17	17	And the Kosher Cupcakes	August 9, 2012	0.49	4	4	0.26	0.75
18	18	And the One-Night Stands	August 16, 2012	0.63	3	3	—N/a	0.63
19	19	And the Spring Break	August 23, 2012	0.60	6	6	—N/a	0.60
20	20	And the Drug Money	August 30, 2012	0.72	4	4	—N/a	0.72
21	21	And the Messy Purse Smackdown	September 6, 2012	0.59	7	7	—N/a	0.59
22	22	And the Buttercream Breakthrough	September 13, 2012	0.69	5	5	—N/a	0.69
23	23	And Martha Stewart Have a Ball (Part 1)	September 20, 2012	0.64	7	7	—N/a	0.98
24	24	And Martha Stewart Have a Ball (Part 2)	September 27, 2012	0.70	7	7	0.27	0.97

=== Australian ratings ===
No. in series	No. in season	Episode title	Air date	Viewers (million)	Ref
1	1	Pilot	February 14, 2012	0.98	
2	2	And the Break-up Scene	February 21, 2012	0.82	
3	3	And the Strokes of Goodwill	February 28, 2012	0.78	
4	4	And the Rich People Problems	March 13, 2012	0.64	
5	5	And the '90s Horse Party	March 13, 2012	0.65	
6	6	And the Disappearing Bed	March 20, 2012	0.67	
7	7	And the Pretty Problem	March 20, 2012	—N/a	—N/a
8	8	And Hoarder Culture	March 27, 2012	0.52	
9	9	And the Really Petty Cash	March 27, 2012	0.41	
10	10	And the Very Christmas Thanksgiving	April 24, 2012	1.04	
11	11	And the Reality Check	May 1, 2012	0.85	
12	12	And the Pop-Up Sale	May 8, 2012	0.72	
13	13	And the Secret Ingredient	May 8, 2012	0.64	
14	14	And the Upstairs Neighbor	May 15, 2012	0.76	
15	15	And the Blind Spot	May 15, 2012	0.67	
16	16	And the Broken Hearts	May 22, 2012	0.67	
17	17	And the Kosher Cupcakes	May 22, 2012	0.71	
18	18	And the One-Night Stands	May 29, 2012	0.65	
19	19	And the Spring Break	June 12, 2012	0.74	
20	20	And the Drug Money	June 19, 2012	0.68	
21	21	And the Messy Purse Smackdown	June 26, 2012	0.59	
22	22	And the Big Buttercream Breakthrough	July 10, 2012	0.50	
23	23	And Martha Stewart Have a Ball (Part 1)	July 17, 2012	0.49	
24	24	And Martha Stewart Have a Ball (Part 2)	July 24, 2012	—N/a	—N/a

== DVD release ==
The DVD boxset and Blu-ray for season one was released by Warner Home Video on September 4, 2012 in the United States. The set contains three discs, each with eight episodes, unaired scenes and a featurette titled "2 Girls Going for Broke". The featurette contains behind the scenes material with the cast and creators. The DVD set and Blu-ray was released in Region 2 on October 17, 2012 while in Region 4, the DVD set was released on October 22, 2012.

The Complete First Season
Set details		Special features
24 episodes; 3-disc set (DVD); 2-disc set (Blu-ray); 1.78:1 aspect ratio; Subtitles: English, French, Spanish, Swedish; English: Dolby Digital 5.1 (DVD); English: DTS-HD Master Audio 5.1 (Blu-ray)		2 Girls Going 4 Broke; Behind the scenes with cast and creators; Unaired scenes
DVD/Blu-ray release date
Region 1	Region 2	Region 4
September 4, 2012	October 22, 2012 (DVD only)	October 17, 2012
