= 2 Broke Girls season 4 =

Season of television series

2 Broke Girls
- Season 4
- DVD cover
- Starring: Kat Dennings; Beth Behrs; Garrett Morris; Jonathan Kite; Matthew Moy; Jennifer Coolidge
- No. of episodes: 22

Release
- Original network: CBS
- Original release: October 27, 2014 – May 18, 2015

Season chronology
- ← Previous; Season 3 Next → Season 5

The fourth season of the American television sitcom 2 Broke Girls premiered on CBS on October 27, 2014, and concluded on May 18, 2015. The series was created and executively produced by Michael Patrick King and Whitney Cummings. The season focuses on Max Black, a sarcastic below-the-poverty-line waitress, and Caroline Channing, a disgraced New York socialite turned waitress, as they continue their cupcake business venture.

Kat Dennings and Beth Behrs portray the two lead characters of the series, Max Black and Caroline Channing. The main cast is rounded out by actors Garrett Morris, Jonathan Kite, Matthew Moy, and Jennifer Coolidge, who portray Earl, Oleg, Han Lee, and Sophie Kaczynski, respectively.

It is the first season to have 22 episodes instead of the regular 24 of the previous three seasons.

== Plot ==
Max (Kat Dennings) and Caroline (Beth Behrs) continue to work at a Brooklyn diner where they still dish up sarcasm and smarts — and sell Max’s Homemade Cupcakes at the diner’s pop-up window. New opportunities are on the horizon, as the girls continue looking for ways to increase their revenue and end up applying for a loan to produce more; eventually they get a second job as pastry chef and hostess to pay for it. In the meantime, Max and Caroline's neighbor Sophie continues her relationship with Oleg, and they finally decide to take the next step when they get engaged.

== Cast and characters ==
- Kat Dennings as Max Black
- Beth Behrs as Caroline Channing
- Jonathan Kite as Oleg
- Garrett Morris as Earl
- Matthew Moy as Han
- Jennifer Coolidge as Sophie Kaczynsky

== Episodes ==
No. overall	No. in season	Title	Directed by	Written by	Original release date	Prod. code	U.S. viewers (millions)
73	1	"And the Reality Problem"	Don Scardino	Michael Patrick King	October 27, 2014	2J6901	8.43
A producer offers to shoot an episode of Keeping Up with the Kardashians at the cupcake shop, but backs out at the last minute. Caroline is forced to make a drastic change. In the end, Kim Kardashian pays the cupcake shop a visit. Final tally for cupcake business venture: $1,950
74	2	"And the DJ Face"	Don Scardino	Liz Astrof	November 3, 2014	2J6902	7.97
Max learns her weekly booty call (Jesse Metcalfe) is a DJ at a Whole Foods store. At the store, Caroline has an unexpected reunion with a former high society friend. Sophie uses a Ouija Board to determine if she is meant to get back together with Oleg. Final tally for cupcake business venture: $2,300
75	3	"And the Childhood Not Included"	Don Scardino	Michelle Nader	November 10, 2014	2J6903	7.55
Max receives her old Teddy Ruxpin back from her mother. She and Caroline differ about whether to sell it when the latter accidentally loses the most valuable fish in Han's newly installed aquarium. Final tally for cupcake business venture: $2,285
76	4	"And the Old Bike Yarn"	Don Scardino	Patrick Walsh	November 17, 2014	2J6904	7.90
Caroline starts using an abandoned bike to make deliveries, but Max is unable to do her share because she cannot ride a bicycle. Sophie and Oleg run into difficulty rekindling their relationship. Final tally for cupcake business venture: $2,735
77	5	"And the Brand Job"	Don Scardino	Morgan Murphy	November 24, 2014	2J6905	6.85
As a result of Max's latest behavior, Caroline throws her a "business intervention" by booking two seats in a two-day business seminar. Things do not go according to plan, however, when the two are at odds over how to move forward with their business. Final tally for cupcake business venture: $1,695
78	6	"And the Model Apartment"	Don Scardino	Linda Videtti Figueiredo	December 8, 2014	2J6906	7.72
Max and Caroline rent their apartment via Airbnb to some models in town for the annual Victoria's Secret Fashion Show. The two spend the weekend in Sophie's apartment as she goes on vacation, but are lured back to their own apartment when the models throw a huge party. Final tally for cupcake business venture: $3,195
79	7	"And a Loan for Christmas"	Don Scardino	Charles Brottmiller	December 15, 2014	2J6907	7.81
When their cupcake t-shirt sales begin to gain momentum, Caroline tries to convince Max to apply for a loan to produce more of their product to sell at a trendy, upscale store. Meanwhile, determined to win a decorating contest, Sophie enlists the help of the two girls and the diner crew to create a living Nativity display. Final tally for cupcake business venture: $3,945
80	8	"And the Fun Factory"	Don Scardino	Michael Rowe	January 5, 2015	2J6908	9.08
With their $10,000 loan in hand, Max and Caroline select a factory to produce their cupcake T-shirts. Max soon becomes suspicious of the work conditions there when she and Caroline meet the company's overly enthusiastic employees. Meanwhile, Sophie starts a new business. Final tally for cupcake business venture: $13,945
81	9	"And the Past and the Furious"	Don Scardino	Michelle Nader & Liz Astrof	January 19, 2015	2J6909	8.86
Caroline has a birthday present delivered to the restaurant: a $450,000 Lamborghini Aventador that her father ordered in 2011, knowing it would take four years to build. But her joy is short-lived when she finds it will be seized in the morning. That does not stop Max from taking the car and a drugged Caroline on a joyride to The Hamptons. Meanwhile, Oleg proposes to Sophie. Final tally for cupcake business venture: $13,545
82	10	"And the Move-In Meltdown"	Don Scardino	Patrick Walsh	February 2, 2015	2J6910	9.31
Han helps Oleg move in with Sophie, but Sophie does not like any of Oleg's stuff and will not let him keep anything in her apartment. Sophie throws a party to mark the occasion of Oleg moving in, but the two have a fight. Sophie drives back Oleg's stuff, but gets in an accident when Caroline suggests that Sophie is being unreasonable. In the end, Oleg and Sophie make up when Sophie admits that she is scared of their new relationship status. Meanwhile, Caroline decides to buy heating lamps for outdoor seating at their cupcake window. Final tally for cupcake business venture: $13,395
83	11	"And the Crime Ring"	Don Scardino	Morgan Murphy	February 9, 2015	2J6911	9.13
While trying to sell cupcake T-shirts at a club, Caroline is hit on by a handsome man and goes home with him, but later realizes she left jewelry of sentimental value at his place. When he does not return her texts for two weeks, Caroline has Max help her break into the man's apartment, but she picks the wrong apartment and the two get arrested. Meanwhile, Sophie had asked Max to be her maid of honor and was rejected, which gives her a bargaining chip when the girls need to be bailed out of jail. Final tally for cupcake business venture: $3,395
84	12	"And the Knock Off Knock Out"	Don Scardino	Justin Sayre	February 16, 2015	2J6912	8.74
The girls find out two rich high school girls are selling knock-offs of their cupcake T-shirts, so they "lawyer up" with Han playing their legal counsel. Meanwhile, Sophie is going overboard on her wedding planning. Final tally for cupcake business venture: $3,675
85	13	"And the Great Unwashed"	Don Scardino	Laura Kightlinger	February 23, 2015	2J6913	8.47
When Max and Caroline learn that one of their customers is a successful photographer (Valerie Harper), they discover that the woman is keeping a secret from them, and the outcome lets Caroline down. Meanwhile, Sophie believes Oleg is cheating on her. Final tally for cupcake business venture: $2,675
86	14	"And the Cupcake Captives"	Don Scardino	Charles Brottmiller	March 9, 2015	2J6914	8.25
As Max and Caroline prepare for Sophie's bridal shower, the FBI orders them out of the building to search for a man who has held three women hostage in it. Max's Homemade Cupcakes then becomes newsworthy when the suspect emerges in police custody wearing one of the girls' cupcake T-shirts. Final tally for cupcake business venture: $1,475
87	15	"And the Fat Cat"	Fred Savage	Liz Astrof & Michelle Nader	March 23, 2015	2J6915	7.26
Max worries over her missing cat, Nancy. A handsome venture capitalist returns the feline to the apartment, but the girls soon discover that Nancy is pregnant. Caroline flirts with the man to interest him in investing in the cupcake business, but the man interprets it wrong. Final tally for cupcake business venture: $975
88	16	"And the Zero Tolerance"	Fred Savage	Michael Patrick King	March 30, 2015	2J6916	7.13
When Caroline notices the girls' bank balance is less than zero, she and Max desperately look for ways to make enough money for the payments on their T-shirt loan. Soon after, John ("Big Mary") from Max's pastry school comes by to say he is working as a pastry chef at "The High", a new upscale restaurant in Manhattan. He encourages Max to apply for the other pastry chef position that needs to be filled, and Caroline tags along to apply for a waitress job. Final tally for cupcake business venture: –$14
89	17	"And the High Hook-Up"	Fred Savage	Michelle Nader & Liz Astrof	April 13, 2015	2J6917	7.07
Joedth finds a hot, young Irish man named Nashit (Austin Falk) on a bench outside The High, and hires him, asking Caroline to train him as a waiter. Max falls in love with him and vows to get Nashit into bed, but doing so would violate Joedth's strict "no hook ups among employees" policy. After the two are caught, Han hires Nashit to work as a dishwasher at the diner. Final tally for cupcake business venture: $286
90	18	"And the Taste Test"	Jim Rose & Fred Savage	Charles Brottmiller & Justin Sayre	April 20, 2015	2J6918	7.53
Caroline replaces Sophie's sister as her other bridesmaid. But she and Max hurt Sophie's feelings when they try to avoid receiving the dresses Sophie has selected for them. Final tally for cupcake business venture: $711
91	19	"And the Look of the Irish"	Fred Savage	Patrick Walsh & Karen Kilgariff	April 27, 2015	2J6919	6.57
Caroline finds an opportunity to set up Nash in a modeling career. After some painful preparation, Caroline and Max take Nash to an audition for a Cocoa Puffs commercial, but it is not what they expected. Final tally for cupcake business venture: $1,211
92	20	"And the Minor Problem"	Fred Savage	Liz Astrof	May 4, 2015	2J6920	6.43
Caroline scores Nash an underwear shoot, so Joedth rewards her with the manager position at a new location for The High, and the opportunity to take Max along. However, Nash's mother arrives unexpectedly to take him back to Ireland, forcing the girls to kidnap him back or lose their jobs at The High. Final tally for cupcake business venture: $2,261
93	21	"And the Grate Expectations"	Fred Savage	Michelle Nader	May 11, 2015	2J6921	6.96
At Oleg's bachelor party, Han inadvertently discloses a secret that leads Sophie to cancel the wedding. The girls and Big Mary open up a new branch of The High that, much to their dismay, is located in an airport. Final tally for cupcake business venture: $3,261
94	22	"And the Disappointing Unit"	Michael Patrick King	Michael Patrick King	May 18, 2015	2J6922	7.56
Sophie and Oleg get married, despite some challenges on their wedding day. Disappointing sales at the airport branch of The High put the girls' future there in doubt. The Girls then end up going to Paris using the tickets they got to get into the airport to kidnap Nash. The episode ends with Max and Caroline drinking champagne from their cabin crew friends. Final tally for cupcake business venture: $89

== Ratings ==
Viewership and ratings per episode of 2 Broke Girls season 4
No.	Title	Air date	Rating/share (18–49)	Viewers (millions)
1	"And the Reality Problem"	October 27, 2014	2.4/7	8.43
2	"And the DJ Face"	November 3, 2014	2.2/7	7.97
3	"And the Childhood Not Included"	November 10, 2014	1.9/6	7.55
4	"And the Old Bike Yarn"	November 17, 2014	2.1/6	7.90
5	"And the Brand Job"	November 24, 2014	1.6/5	6.85
6	"And the Model Apartment"	December 8, 2014	2.0/6	7.72
7	"And a Loan for Christmas"	December 15, 2014	2.1/7	7.81
8	"And the Fun Factory"	January 5, 2015	2.4/7	9.08
9	"And the Past and the Furious"	January 19, 2015	2.2/7	8.86
10	"And the Move-In Meltdown"	February 2, 2015	2.4/7	9.31
11	"And the Crime Ring"	February 9, 2015	2.3/7	9.13
12	"And the Knock Off Knock Out"	February 16, 2015	2.2/6	8.74
13	"And the Great Unwashed"	February 23, 2015	2.1/7	8.47
14	"And the Cupcake Captives"	March 9, 2015	2.1/7	8.25
15	"And the Fat Cat"	March 23, 2015	1.9/7	7.26
16	"And the Zero Tolerance"	March 30, 2015	1.8/6	7.13
17	"And the High Hook-Up"	April 13, 2015	1.8/7	7.07
18	"And the Taste Test"	April 20, 2015	2.1/7	7.53
19	"And the Look of the Irish"	April 27, 2015	1.6/6	6.57
20	"And the Minor Problem"	May 4, 2015	1.7/6	6.43
21	"And the Grate Expectations"	May 11, 2015	1.6/6	6.96
22	"And the Disappointing Unit"	May 18, 2015	2.0/7	7.56
