= 2 Broke Girls season 2 =

Season of television series

2 Broke Girls
- Season 2
- DVD cover
- Starring: Kat Dennings; Beth Behrs; Garrett Morris; Jonathan Kite; Matthew Moy; Jennifer Coolidge
- No. of episodes: 24

Release
- Original network: CBS
- Original release: September 24, 2012 – May 13, 2013

Season chronology
- ← Previous; Season 1 Next → Season 3

The second season of the American television sitcom 2 Broke Girls premiered on CBS on September 24, 2012, and concluded on May 13, 2013. The series was created and executively produced by Michael Patrick King and Whitney Cummings. The season focuses on Max Black, a sarcastic below-the-poverty-line waitress, and Caroline Channing, a disgraced New York socialite turned waitress, as they continue their cupcake business venture, opening a store for Max's Homemade Cupcakes.

Kat Dennings and Beth Behrs portray the two lead characters of the series, Max Black and Caroline Channing. The main cast is rounded out by actors Garrett Morris, Jonathan Kite, Matthew Moy, and Jennifer Coolidge, who portray Earl, Oleg, Han Lee, and Sophie Kaczynski, respectively.

2 Broke Girls' first season aired during the 2012–13 television season on Mondays at 9:00 p.m. EST. The season premiere debuted to 10.14 million viewers, almost half the audience of last season's premiere. The season averaged 10.63 million viewers.

== Plot ==
In this second season, Max and Caroline are continuing to hustle and putting themselves in hilarious situations to keep their dream cupcake business going. Caroline soon discovers love with Andy (Ryan Hansen), but she has to choose between him or her future.

== Cast and characters ==
- Kat Dennings as Max Black
- Beth Behrs as Caroline Channing
- Jonathan Kite as Oleg
- Garrett Morris as Earl
- Matthew Moy as Han
- Jennifer Coolidge as Sophie Kaczynsky

== Production ==
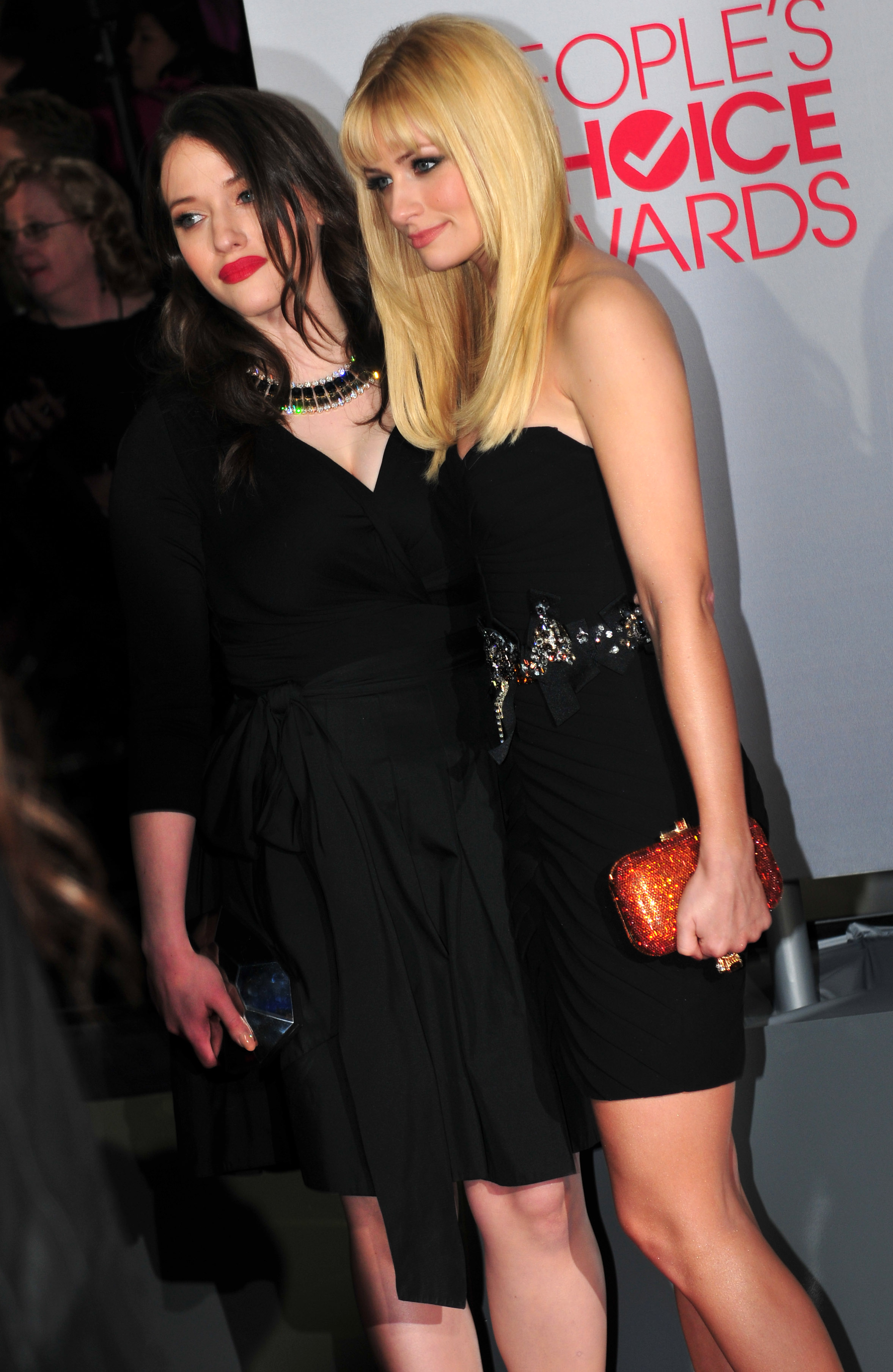
Dennings and Behrs were the first actors cast in the series

The first season employed a cast a six main actors. Actresses Kat Dennings and Beth Behrs return to portray their respective roles as Max Black, a sarcastic below-the-poverty-line waitress, and Caroline Channing, a former socialite who is bankrupt following her father's arrest for his involvement in a Ponzi scheme. Jonathan Kite, Garrett Morris and Matthew Moy also return as Oleg, a foreign hypersexed cook; Earl, a wise but hip elderly cashier; and Han, the Korean proprietor of the diner. Jennifer Coolidge joins the main cast for the second season, portraying Sophie Kaczynski, a Polish cleaning businesswoman who moves into the building where Max and Caroline live, beginning in the episode "And the Upstairs Neighbor". Nick Zano returns as a guest to portray Johnny, a street artist and Max's potential love interest.

== Episodes ==
No. overall	No. in season	Title	Directed by	Written by	Original release date	Prod. code	U.S. viewers (millions)
25	1	"And the Hidden Stash"	Fred Savage	Michelle Nader	September 24, 2012	2J6703	10.14
With Caroline despondent over the upcoming auction of her family property, Max joins her for a visit to her imprisoned father, Martin Channing (Steven Weber). He tells her to attend the auction and buy, at any cost, a loving cup she won in a horse-jumping competition as a child. Max believes that there is money hidden in the cup and convinces a disguised Caroline to attend the auction. Sophie and Oleg both go to the auction together as a "first date". Final tally for cupcake business venture: $727
26	2	"And the Pearl Necklace"	Fred Savage	Michael Patrick King	October 1, 2012	2J6701	9.22
Max and Caroline attempt to follow up with Martha Stewart, who tasted and liked one of their cupcakes in last season's finale, hoping she will call and help support their business. Meanwhile, Caroline accidentally ruins her lucky pearl necklace. Final tally for cupcake business venture: $877
27	3	"And the Hold-Up"	Fred Savage	Jhoni Marchinko	October 8, 2012	2J6702	9.42
Han surprises everyone by foiling an attempt to rob the diner, but Caroline's cowardice leads to a rift between her and Max. The two attempt to make up by sneaking into a movie. Final tally for cupcake business venture: $995
28	4	"And the Cupcake War"	Fred Savage	Molly McAleer	October 15, 2012	2J6704	9.30
Caroline convinces Max to audition for Cupcake Wars, a Food Network show, to build their business. They find themselves competing against two New Orleans-based women with a better brand. Final tally for cupcake business venture: $1,028
29	5	"And the Pre-Approved Credit Card"	Fred Savage	Sonny Lee and Patrick Walsh	November 5, 2012	2J6706	9.01
Earl's son Darius (Cedric the Entertainer) visits town from Detroit to try to break into standup comedy. The girls try to help improve his act. Final tally for cupcake business venture: $1,128
30	6	"And the Candy Manwich"	Fred Savage	Liz Feldman	November 12, 2012	2J6705	8.94
Taking some time off to go out for lunch, Max and Caroline vie for the attention of handsome candy store owner, Andy (Ryan Hansen). He asks Caroline out, but a series of humiliating experiences has Caroline thinking Andy will change his mind. At the diner, Han and Sophie clash over her taking a booth for herself every night. Final tally for cupcake business venture: $1,128
31	7	"And the Three Boys with Wood"	Thomas Kail	Morgan Murphy	November 19, 2012	2J6707	9.74
Max and Caroline hire two Amish boys who are away on their rumspringa to build a barn for Chestnut. Andy makes a discovery about Caroline. Final tally for cupcake business venture: $1,328
32	8	"And the Egg Special"	Thomas Kail	Tracy Poust and Jon Kinnally	November 26, 2012	2J6708	11.74
After a blurb about their business appears in Martha Stewart Living, orders pick up and Caroline persuades Max that they should rent a nearby vacant storefront to use as their shop. However, they are unable to find anyone willing to lend them the money. Final tally for cupcake business venture: $21,328
33	9	"And the New Boss"	Don Scardino	Michelle Nader	December 3, 2012	2J6709	10.17
Max and Caroline decide to bring in an unpaid intern named Ruth (Abby Elliott), for their store, but Ruth is a horrible worker and Max can't get over a mental block and fire her ass. Eventually, Max does get over it, and does fire Ruth right before the store opens. Final tally for cupcake business venture: $7,328
34	10	"And the Big Opening"	Lonny Price	Michael Patrick King	December 10, 2012	2J6710	11.04
The girls finally open the cupcake shop. But Max is put in a difficult position when Johnny shows up at the opening night party—and he is available. Final tally for cupcake business venture: $5,328
35	11	"And the Silent Partner"	Don Scardino	Tracy Poust and Jon Kinnally	December 10, 2012	2J6711	10.78
When Sophie's contractors of her dream house run off with her money, Max offers her a silent partnership in the cupcake shop. However, Sophie's business decisions push Caroline over the edge. Meanwhile, Andy tries to devise the perfect scenario to tell Caroline he loves her. Final tally for cupcake business venture: $3,328
36	12	"And the High Holidays"	Don Scardino	Molly McAleer	December 17, 2012	2J6712	10.22
Short on the cupcake store's rent, Max and a reluctant Caroline turn to a dubious sector of the market. Final tally for cupcake business venture: $100
37	13	"And the Bear Truth"	Scott Ellis	Liz Feldman	January 14, 2013	2J6714	12.45
Max, Caroline, and Andy spend a weekend vacationing in a cabin in the woods. The cramped quarters force Andy and Caroline to assess their relationship, while Max seeks the company of the gay couple next door. Final tally for cupcake business venture: $900
38	14	"And Too Little Sleep"	Scott Ellis	Jhoni Marchinko and Michelle Nader	January 21, 2013	2J6713	11.56
The entire diner staff pulls an all-nighter to help Max and Caroline finish a big cupcake order. When Caroline discovers that Max and Andy are continuing their friendly texting to each other, it causes friction between the girls. Final tally for cupcake business venture: $4,900
39	15	"And the Psychic Shakedown"	Ken Whittingham	Michael Patrick King	February 4, 2013	2J6715	11.36
Caroline visits a psychic (Caroline Aaron) to learn about her romantic future after discovering that Andy has closed his shop following their breakup. Final tally for cupcake business venture: $4,800
40	16	"And Just Plane Magic"	Ken Whittingham	Molly McAleer	February 11, 2013	2J6716	10.90
A chance encounter on a late night after work leads to Max and Caroline flying to the Grammys on a private jet with 2 Chainz. Final tally for cupcake business venture: $4,800
41	17	"And the Broken Hip"	Ken Whittingham	Charles Brottmiller	February 18, 2013	2J6717	10.25
Max's idea to rename the shop's cupcakes after 1990s celebrities brings in a large number of hipster customers. After the girls attempt to remove a street performer (Andy Dick) from the entrance of the shop, the performer slips on a stray cupcake and sues the shop for damages to his marionette. Lacking insurance, the girls resort to weird methods to make the man come to terms. Final tally for cupcake business venture: $3,800
42	18	"And Not-So-Sweet Charity"	Fred Savage	Morgan Murphy	February 25, 2013	2J6718	10.41
Facing eviction, Max and Caroline approach Caroline's rich but callous Aunt Charity (Missi Pyle) for money to save the cupcake shop. However, family issues get in the way. Final tally for cupcake business venture: $1
43	19	"And the Temporary Distraction"	Fred Savage	Sonny Lee and Patrick Walsh	March 18, 2013	2J6719	8.56
Still needing cash to pay the rent, Max talks Caroline into taking a temp position at a nearby office. The position soon leads to the possibility of a permanent job for Caroline, but Max has not yet given up on the cupcake business. Final tally for cupcake business venture: $5
44	20	"And the Big Hole"	Fred Savage	Liz Feldman	March 25, 2013	2J6720	8.76
After Han fires Caroline for disparaging the diner, she takes a job redecorating Oleg's apartment so it will seem nicer to Sophie. But neither Oleg nor Sophie are impressed with Caroline's work. Max schemes to get Han and Caroline to swallow their pride and apologize to each other. Final tally for cupcake business venture: $205
45	21	"And the Worst Selfie Ever"	Phill Lewis	Laura Kightlinger	April 15, 2013	2J6721	7.54
Following a booty call with Andy, Caroline believes she has contracted a sexually transmitted disease. Meanwhile, Han tries to meet women via an online dating service. Final tally for cupcake business venture: $205
46	22	"And the Extra Work"	Michael McDonald	Jon Kinnally and Tracy Poust	April 29, 2013	2J6722	7.85
When Law & Order: Special Victims Unit shoots a scene in the diner, Max and Caroline are offered extra roles. However, Caroline is quickly given a more substantial role, with strings attached. Meanwhile, Han seeks to be compensated by the film crew for "broken" items in the diner and Sophie attempts to break into show business. Final tally for cupcake business venture: $1,205
47	23	"And the Tip Slip"	Lonny Price	Michelle Nader	May 6, 2013	2J6723	7.97
When a woman claims to have had a relationship with Martin Channing and is going to write a tell-all book about their affairs, Caroline and Max take drastic measures to try to get the woman to come to terms. Final tally for cupcake business venture: $940
48	24	"And the Window of Opportunity"	Phill Lewis	Michael Patrick King	May 13, 2013	2J6724	8.94
When Max and Caroline offer to deep-clean a previously hidden part of the diner, they discover something that could relaunch their cupcake business. Final tally for cupcake business venture: $1,540

== Ratings ==
Viewership and ratings per episode of 2 Broke Girls season 2
No.	Title	Air date	Rating/share (18–49)	Viewers (millions)
1	"And the Hidden Stash"	September 24, 2012	3.7/9	10.14
2	"And the Pearl Necklace"	October 1, 2012	3.5	9.22
3	"And the Hold-Up"	October 8, 2012	3.4	9.42
4	"And The Cupcake War"	October 15, 2012	3.4	9.30
5	"And the Pre-Approved Credit Card"	November 5, 2012	3.2/8	9.01
6	"And the Candy Manwich"	November 12, 2012	3.2/8	8.94
7	"And the Three Boys With Wood"	November 19, 2012	3.4/8	9.74
8	"And the Egg Special"	November 26, 2012	4.1/10	11.74
9	"And the New Boss"	December 3, 2012	3.5/9	10.17
10	"And the Big Opening"	December 10, 2012	3.7/9	11.04
11	"And the Silent Partner"	December 10, 2012	3.8/9	10.78
12	"And the High Holidays"	December 17, 2012	3.5/9	10.22
13	"And Bear Truth"	January 14, 2013	4.1/10	12.45
14	"And Too Little Sleep"	January 21, 2013	3.7/9	11.56
15	"And the Psychic Shakedown"	February 4, 2013	3.7/9	11.36
16	"And Just Plane Magic"	February 11, 2013	3.6/9	10.90
17	"And the Broken Hip"	February 18, 2013	3.5/9	10.25
18	"And Not-So-Sweet Charity"	February 25, 2013	3.3/8	10.41
19	"And the Temporary Distraction"	March 18, 2013	2.8/7	8.56
20	"And the Big Hole"	March 25, 2013	3.0/8	8.76
21	"And the Worst Selfie Ever"	April 15, 2013	2.4/6	7.54
22	"And the Extra Work"	April 29, 2013	2.6/7	7.85
23	"And the Tip Slip"	May 6, 2013	2.7/7	7.97
24	"And the Window of Opportunity"	May 13, 2013	3.0/8	8.94
