= 2 Broke Girls =

2011 American television sitcom

- Genre: Sitcom
- Created by: Michael Patrick King; Whitney Cummings
- Starring: Kat Dennings; Beth Behrs; Garrett Morris; Jonathan Kite; Matthew Moy; Jennifer Coolidge
- Theme music composer: Peter Bjorn and John
- Opening theme: "Second Chance"
- Country of origin: United States
- Original language: English
- No. of seasons: 6
- No. of episodes: 138 (list of episodes)

Production
- Executive producers: Michael Patrick King; Whitney Cummings; Michelle Nader; Liz Astrof
- Cinematography: Gary Baum; Joseph W. Calloway; Christian La Fountaine
- Editors: Peter Chakos; Darryl Bates; Ben Bosse; Chris Poulos
- Camera setup: Multi-camera
- Running time: 21–22 minutes
- Production companies: Michael Patrick King Productions; Warner Bros. Television

Original release
- Network: CBS
- Release: September 19, 2011 – April 17, 2017

2 Broke Girls (stylized as 2 BROKE GIRL$) is an American television sitcom that aired on CBS from September 19, 2011, to April 17, 2017. The series was produced for Warner Bros. Television and created by Michael Patrick King and Whitney Cummings. Set in the Williamsburg neighborhood of Brooklyn in New York City, the show's plot follows the lives of best friends Max Black (Kat Dennings) and Caroline Channing (Beth Behrs). Whereas Caroline was raised as the daughter of a billionaire, Max grew up in a poor and dysfunctional family, resulting in them having different perspectives on life, although together they work in a local diner (Williamsburg Diner) while attempting to raise funds to start a cupcake business.

The series has received a polarized response from critics and audiences alike. The on-screen chemistry between the show's six leads, especially that of Behrs and Dennings, has been praised, while others have criticized the show's reliance on sexualized, drug-related, and racial humor. The series was nominated for 12 Emmy Awards in various categories over its run, winning an Emmy in 2012 for art direction.

The series ran on CBS for six seasons and 138 episodes.

== Synopsis ==
The series chronicles the lives of two waitresses in their mid-20s (at the start of the series): Max Black (Kat Dennings), the daughter of a poor underclass mother and an unknown father, and Caroline Channing (Beth Behrs), who was born rich but is now disgraced and penniless because her father, Martin Channing, got caught operating a Bernie Madoff-esque Ponzi scheme. The two work together at a Brooklyn diner (Williamsburg Diner), soon becoming roommates and best friends while working towards their goal of opening a cupcake shop. Among those working with them at the restaurant are their Korean boss Han Lee (Matthew Moy); Oleg (Jonathan Kite), an upbeat but perverted and harassing Ukrainian cook; and Earl (Garrett Morris), a 75-year-old cashier. Also featured starting late in the first season is their neighbor and part-time boss Sophie (Jennifer Coolidge), a Polish immigrant who runs the house-cleaning company Sophie's Choice.

For most of the first season, Max also works a part-time nanny for the twin babies of Peach Landis (Brooke Lyons), who during the season adopts Caroline's horse Chestnut. At the end of each episode, a tally shows how much they have made toward their goal of $250,000. Early in the second season, Sophie lends the women $20,000, which is enough for them to start their business. However, the business fails, and in the 18th episode, they are forced to give up the lease of their cupcake shop with just enough money to pay off Sophie's loan, resetting the end of episode tally to $1. The shop opposite to theirs belongs to Andrew (Ryan Hansen) who had his own candy shop called Candy Andy. He and Caroline become romantically involved, but they eventually break up because her focus is on her cupcake business.

During the third season, Caroline and Max reopen the business in the back room of the diner where they work, using a window as a walk-up window for sales. Max also enrolls in, and Caroline goes to work for, a pastry school called the Manhattan School of Pastry, where Max finds a friend, and later love interest, named Deke. This is Max's first relationship since the second episode when she broke up with her cheating boyfriend, Robbie. Caroline unknowingly has an affair with the married French instructor named Nicholas, who works at the pastry school. This eventually leads to Nicholas closing down the school and moving back to France with his wife. Max, Caroline, and Deke also attempt to get Deke's parents to invest in the school, planning to run it themselves, but they do not succeed.

During season four, the women finally start their cupcake business, which succeeds briefly before going into the red. Both Max and Caroline end up working in an elite-class pastry shop called "The High" to make more money to return the loan they took for their business. Max also had a brief fling with a new handsome waiter, Nashit. She later discovers he is under 18 when his mother arrives from Ireland to bring him back home. At the end of season four, Oleg and Sophie get married.

In season five, Caroline sells her life story to a film producer for $250,000. She uses most of the money to expand their old cupcake space into the adjacent pizza shop, converting it into a dessert bar. The remaining $30,000 is used to purchase part ownership of the diner to help Han pay off his debts from gambling on women's tennis. While in Hollywood with Caroline consulting on her life story script, Max meets a "lawyer to the stars" named Randy. Meanwhile, despite her advancing age, Sophie becomes pregnant with Oleg's child.

Season six has Sophie and Oleg welcoming their baby daughter Barbara to the world. Randy returns to continue his relationship with Max, but it does not work out. Randy wants Max to move to Los Angeles, but Max, publicly acknowledging her strong friendship with Caroline for the first time, says she cannot do so because she has important people in her life now. Meanwhile, Caroline meets Bobby, a contractor who rebuilds the dessert bar after a storm, and the two start a relationship. By the end of the season, the movie about Caroline's life has been made (albeit with some "creative license" changes), but Caroline destroys a $10,000 on-loan dress at the premiere, which wipes out both her and Max's combined savings and returns them to "broke" status. Randy comes back to New York, this time permanently, and proposes to Max, who accepts. The series ends at this point, as the network unexpectedly canceled 2 Broke Girls without allowing the creative team to resolve its plotlines.

== Cast ==
=== Main ===
- Kat Dennings as Maxine "Max" George Black, one of the waitresses at the Williamsburg Diner. She is a poor underclass girl who had a rough childhood in Hope, Rhode Island, and an equally rough adult life, driven by both poverty and being raised by a mother who was usually absent and dangerously incompetent when she was around (it is strongly implied that her mother is a longtime drug addict). Han initially allows her to sell homemade cupcakes in the diner, which leads to her going forward with Caroline's idea to go into the cupcake business. Max is street-smart, tends to deliver insults with a smile, and often pokes fun at her own promiscuous behavior, voluptuous breasts, and marijuana indulgence. She always wears knee-high brown leather boots and a name tag while waitressing. She is co-godmothers with Caroline to Barbara Kaczyński-Golishevsky.
- Beth Behrs as Caroline Wesbox Channing, a waitress at the Williamsburg Diner. She is a slim, blonde, formerly rich high-society girl and University of Pennsylvania Wharton graduate who lost all of her money when her father Martin was arrested and sent to jail for a Ponzi scheme. She is forced to start over and becomes Max's co-worker, roommate, and best friend. She comes up with the idea of starting a cupcake business with Max. Despite being spoiled since birth and then losing her money, Caroline is kind and optimistic, although sometimes high-maintenance. She is sometimes very clueless. She always wears large pearl necklaces with her waitress uniform, as well as high-heeled shoes and a thin gold belt around her waist. Unlike Max, she does not wear a name tag with her waitress uniform. She is co-godmothers with Max to Barbara Kaczyński-Golishevsky.
- Garrett Morris as Earl Washington, the elderly African-American cashier who has worked at the Williamsburg Diner since 1962, or 1989, and a former jazz musician with a love of marijuana and gambling. Max is very close to him, and frequently says that she wishes he was her father. By season six, Earl is starting to show signs of memory loss, but the show never explored the topic with any seriousness.
- Jonathan Kite as Vanko Oleg Golishevsky, a Ukrainian cook at the Williamsburg Diner. He sexually harasses Max and Caroline frequently with inappropriate jokes, innuendo, and propositions for sex, but his behavior is benign and easily ignored (or mocked, by Max). He later develops an attraction to Sophie, and has a purely sexual relationship with her. At the end of season two, Oleg cheats on Sophie, leading her to angrily break up with him off-screen before the third-season premiere. In season four, the two reconcile and get engaged and then married. In the sixth-season premiere, they have a baby daughter named Barbara Kaczyński-Golishevsky.
- Matthew Moy as Han "Bryce" Lee, the owner of the Williamsburg Diner. He is constantly a target for jokes (mainly from Max) involving his lack of height, his effeminate mannerisms in spite of his claims of being heterosexual, and his lack of knowledge of American culture. He is originally from South Korea and he references his parents and his home country often.
- Jennifer Coolidge as Zofia "Sophie" Kaczyński (seasons 2–6, recurring season 1), a loud, tall, blonde, buxom middle-aged Polish woman who owns a cleaning company called Sophie's Choice. She lives in the apartment above the girls, and often tells them stories about her sex life and growing up in Communist Poland. She prefers Max over Caroline and often calls Caroline "fluffy" owing to her ditzy characteristics. Despite multiple bad interactions with the two girls, Sophie still invests in their cupcake business in season two. She always sits in a booth that she considers her own. She is involved in a relationship with Oleg during seasons two and three, gets engaged to him in season four, marries him in the finale, and during season five becomes pregnant with their first child. In the sixth-season premiere, they have a baby girl whom they name Barbara Kaczyński-Golishevsky.

=== Recurring ===
- Chestnut is Caroline's horse, one of the few possessions she was able to retain from her old life prior to her father's business scandal. During the first season, Chestnut lives full-time in the garden of Max's apartment, until Max convinces Caroline to have Peach adopt and stable him so that he could endure the winter weather. At the end of the season, Max goes back to Peach and gets him back. In season two, the girls enlist the help of two Amish boys to convert the garden into a barn as a permanent home for Chestnut. He appears in all seasons. He is portrayed by a horse named Rocky, who died in 2019, along with his sister Ruby.
- Brooke Lyons as Peach Landis (season 1), a high-society mother who acts like the most clueless version of that description. She has two babies, Brad and Angelina (a reference to real-life actors Brad Pitt and Angelina Jolie), whom Max babysits. Peach fired Max from that job to appease an awful friend of hers after a cupcake-catering mishap, and after she begged Max to return full-time, Max initially declined, but later decided that she would only return in a part-time capacity. She has not been seen or heard from since, and the show has made it clear Max no longer has any association with her.
- Nick Zano as Johnny (seasons 1 & 2), Max's on-again-off-again love interest. He tells Max he broke up with Cashandra and that he was about to marry a woman he met just a few months earlier, in the season one finale. He is not seen again until the season 2 episode "And the Big Opening," in which he and Max have sex. They both agree that they only want each other when they are taken by another person. He leaves at the end of that episode, promising her he will see her again someday.
- Ryan Hansen as "Candy" Andy (seasons 2, 5, and 6), a candy-store owner whose business was across from the cupcake store, and Caroline's love interest in season two. In season five, Andy returns to Williamsburg and invites Caroline and Max to his wedding, where he marries Romy, a hat designer. The season-six episode "And the Rock Me on the Dais" reveals Andy divorced Romy, and is also quite wealthy.
- Federico Dordei as Luis (season 3), a flamboyant man who becomes the new day waiter in the season 3 episode "And the Group Head". He is attracted to Oleg.
- Gilles Marini as Nicolas Saintcroix (season 3), a French "master baker", who owns and teaches at the Manhattan School of Pastry. He is Caroline's love interest until she realizes he is married in "And the French Kiss". He is in an open marriage and his wife gives Caroline permission to have sex with him, but Caroline refuses because she does not want to have sex with a married man. He later moves back to France to be with his wife, thus the Manhattan School of Pastry closes.
- Mary Lynn Rajskub as Bebe (season 3), a neurotic pastry chef who works at the front desk of the Manhattan School of Pastry. She later moves to Canada, claiming that "they" have found her. This is a joke aimed at her role as Chloe O'Brian in the espionage show 24, at the end her character has to go into hiding.
- Eric André as Deacon "Deke" Bromberg (season 3), a sarcastic half-black/half-Jewish student at the pastry school who quickly becomes Max's friend, lover, and later ex-boyfriend. He is the second person to whom Max says "I love you" (the first being Caroline). Despite living in a renovated dumpster, he is later revealed to be rich, his parents owning a large elevator company. However, when he contemplates making a stand against his parents after they object to his relationship with Max, she drugs him so Caroline and she can push his dumpster in front of his parents' house, Max knowing that Deke would be unable to cope with being genuinely poor. In "And the Wedding Cake Cake Cake", Max reveals that she and Deke are no longer together and admits she wishes things had worked out between them.
- Patrick Cox as John (seasons 3 & 4), a large, homosexual, bald man who shares a table in the pastry school classroom with Max, who nicknames him "Big Mary". They later work together at The High.
- Sandra Bernhard as Joedth (pronounced "Joe") (season 4), the lesbian owner of The High, a boutique restaurant where Max and Caroline start working.
- Austin Falk as Nashit "Nash" (season 4), a handsome new waiter at The High, later hired by Han to be a dishwasher at the diner. He returns home to Ireland when his mother shows up to get him, also revealing that Nash is not yet 18.
- Ed Quinn as Randy Walsh (seasons 5 & 6), a lawyer who becomes Max's lover while the girls are in Hollywood to discuss the film adaptation of Caroline's life story He later breaks up their relationship before she leaves town, saying that he likes her too much and knows how long-distance relationships usually end, but he then follows her to New York and they briefly continue the relationship. He returns at the end of season six to open a permanent office in New York, and proposes to Max. She accepts.
- Christopher Gorham as Bobby (season 6) is a contractor who helps rebuild the dessert bar after a storm, and soon becomes Caroline's love interest
- Kerri Kenney as Denise (season 6), Bobby's older sister, who is a crazy woman with a romantic eye for Han

=== Special guest stars ===
- Renée Taylor as Hinda Fagel
- Martha Stewart as herself
- Steven Weber as Martin Channing, Caroline's father, who is in prison for a Ponzi scheme he masterminded
- Shangela as Hallelujah, a doorman at a theater Caroline and Max sneak into
- Cedric the Entertainer as Darius, Earl's estranged son
- Caroline Aaron as Wiga, a psychic whom Caroline visits for a reading about her future love life
- 2 Chainz as himself
- Andy Dick as J. Petto, a puppeteer who slips on a cupcake at Max and Caroline's cupcake shop, and tries to sue them over his damaged puppet. He returns in the season 6 premiere to thwart the girls' attempts to obtain a liquor license.
- Missi Pyle as Charity Channing, Caroline's rich and abusive aunt. She refuses to give Max and Caroline a loan for their failing business, and later admits that Caroline's claims to their parents that Charity was abusive to her (which they did not believe) were accurate.
- Debra Wilson as Delores, an exhausted employee at the temporary agency where Max and Caroline work. Her catchphrase, "Let me give you a 'for instance'", was used throughout the episode to illustrate violations to company policies.
- Kym Whitley as Shirley
- Piers Morgan as himself
- Kyle Gass as an SFX operator
- Karen Maruyama as Su-Min Lee, Han's mother, who initially appears as a lame strict stereotype of an "Asian mom", but turns out to be a pro-marijuana woman who loves and even admires her son's decision to leave Korea for the United States
- Jeff Garlin as David, Deke's father
- Sheryl Lee Ralph as Genet, Deke's mother
- Lindsay Lohan as Claire Guinness, a soon-to-be-bride who asks Max and Caroline to make her wedding cake but constantly changes her mind about the cakes and every other thing she has to make decisions about, leading to Max and Caroline having to successfully scam their promised payment from her
- Hal Linden as Lester. Lester is the real named tenant of Max and Caroline's apartment, whose OK is needed for them to (illegally) remain there. He goes from telling them they can stay since he is going to move in with his girlfriend, then becoming their unwanted roommate after said GF dumps him, then saying he will evict them unless Max has sex with him, to finally being conned into letting them re-up on a new legal 10-year lease to the apartment.
- Kim Kardashian as herself
- Jesse Metcalfe as Sebastian, Max's brief fling. He works as a DJ at a grocery chain and Max cannot get over how embarrassing his job is.
- Valerie Harper as Nola Anderz, a regular customer at the diner who is actually a successful photographer
- Ellie Reed as Claire
- Caroline Rhea as Bonnie, a randy flight attendant at the airport where the second branch of The High is located
- Martha Hunt as herself, one of several Victoria's Secret models who stay at Max and Caroline's ahead of a big VS event in Brooklyn
- Lily Aldridge as herself
- Judith Roberts as Astrid, Caroline's grandmother who awakens from a coma with no knowledge of her family's massive money scandal
- Jackée Harry as Ruby, a jazz singer-turned-night club owner who was once involved with Earl until his drug habit drove her away
- George Hamilton as Bob
- Darin Brooks as Frank, Bobby's bowling team-mate
- John Michael Higgins as Elliot, Randy's therapist
- Noah Mills as Robbie, Max's womanizing, alcoholic lover
- Mercedes Ruehl as Olga, Oleg's Ukrainian mother
- Telma Hopkins as Pilar
- French Stewart as Mr. Bronsk
- Chad Michaels as a Cher impersonator
- RuPaul as himself (out of drag)
- Brandon Jones as Jebediah, an Amish man building Chestnut's barn
- Nora Dunn as Teresa, Bobby's overbearing and possessive mother
- Annet Mahendru as Robin
- Marsha Thomason as Cashandra, Johnny's love interest
- Brian Doyle-Murray as Blarney Bill
- Ally Maki as June Kim (Korean Beauty June Kim aka Sapphire), Han's fake girlfriend

== Production ==
=== Development and casting ===
Even before it went to series, the then undeveloped pilot was the subject of a bidding war, with CBS landing the deal on December 10, 2010, and ordering it to series on May 13, 2011. It was one of two shows commissioned for the 2011–2012 television season for which Whitney Cummings served as producer and co-creator, the other being Whitney, which was picked up by NBC, but was cancelled after two seasons.

Dennings was the first to be cast in the role of Max on February 18, 2011. A week later on February 25, 2011, Behrs won an audition to land the role of Caroline, beating out other established actresses. Moy, Morris and Kite were the last three to be cast on March 16, 2011.

=== Filming ===
The series was taped in front of a live studio audience.

=== Timeslot change ===
The first episode aired at 9:30 pm (E/P) after Two and a Half Men on September 19, 2011, and the show moved to its regular timeslot following How I Met Your Mother on Monday nights at 8:30 pm (E/P). Production for the second season began on August 6, 2012.

For its second season 2 Broke Girls moved to 9 pm ET/PT after Two and a Half Men was moved to Thursdays, and remained there until early in its third season.

On March 27, 2013, CBS renewed 2 Broke Girls for a third season. The show was first moved back to its original timeslot, which opened when We Are Men was cancelled, and stayed there until March 24, 2014. Beginning on April 7, 2014, 2 Broke Girls moved to 8 pm to replace How I Met Your Mother following its conclusion, with the show's former timeslot given to the short-lived Friends with Better Lives.

On March 13, 2014, CBS renewed 2 Broke Girls for a fourth season. The network announced a premiere date of October 27, 2014. The move was prompted by CBS' arrangement to air Thursday Night Football for the first few weeks of the season and their subsequent decision not to postpone the season premiere of The Big Bang Theory, which occupied 2 Broke Girls' timeslot until October 20, and then returned to its normal Thursday timeslot. The fourth season consisted of 22 episodes.

On March 12, 2015, CBS renewed 2 Broke Girls for a fifth season, which premiered Thursday, November 12, 2015. CBS moved the show to Thursdays 9:30 pm ET/PT due to Supergirl taking over its previous Monday night timeslot. 2 Broke Girls had its premiere delayed again this season due to CBS airing Thursday Night Football for the season's several weeks initially. By November, regular Thursday programming resumed with The Big Bang Theory and new comedy Life in Pieces moving to Thursdays after airing on Monday nights at the beginning of the season. Mom and 2 Broke Girls then premiered the same month to form CBS' Thursday night comedy block. By midseason, CBS moved 2 Broke Girls to Wednesdays 8 pm ET/PT starting January 6, 2016, pairing it with the final season of Mike & Molly. Both comedies were slated to air for six weeks on the Wednesday 8–9 hour before going on an indefinite hiatus due to Survivor returning to that timeslot the following month. However, on February 8, 2016, CBS cancelled new comedy Angel from Hell with 2 Broke Girls replacing it and returning to its Thursday timeslot on February 18, 2016.

=== Cancellation ===
The series was canceled after six seasons on May 12, 2017. A combination of factors, including declining ratings, CBS's desire to have an ownership stake, and the network needing to clear space for three new sitcoms in the fall 2017 schedule led to the show's demise.

== Episodes ==
Season	Episodes	Originally released	
Season	Episodes	First released	Last released
1	24	September 19, 2011	May 7, 2012
2	24	September 24, 2012	May 13, 2013
3	24	September 23, 2013	May 5, 2014
4	22	October 27, 2014	May 18, 2015
5	22	November 12, 2015	May 12, 2016
6	22	October 10, 2016	April 17, 2017

== Broadcast ==
2 Broke Girls is aired in numerous countries around the world. In Canada, the series airs on Citytv. In the United Kingdom, 2 Broke Girls airs on E4. In Ireland, it airs on RTÉ2. In India, it airs on Star World, Comedy Central and Colors Infinity. In the Philippines, "2 Broke Girls" airs on ETC In Australia, the show airs on 10 Peach In New Zealand, it airs on TV2.

== Reception ==
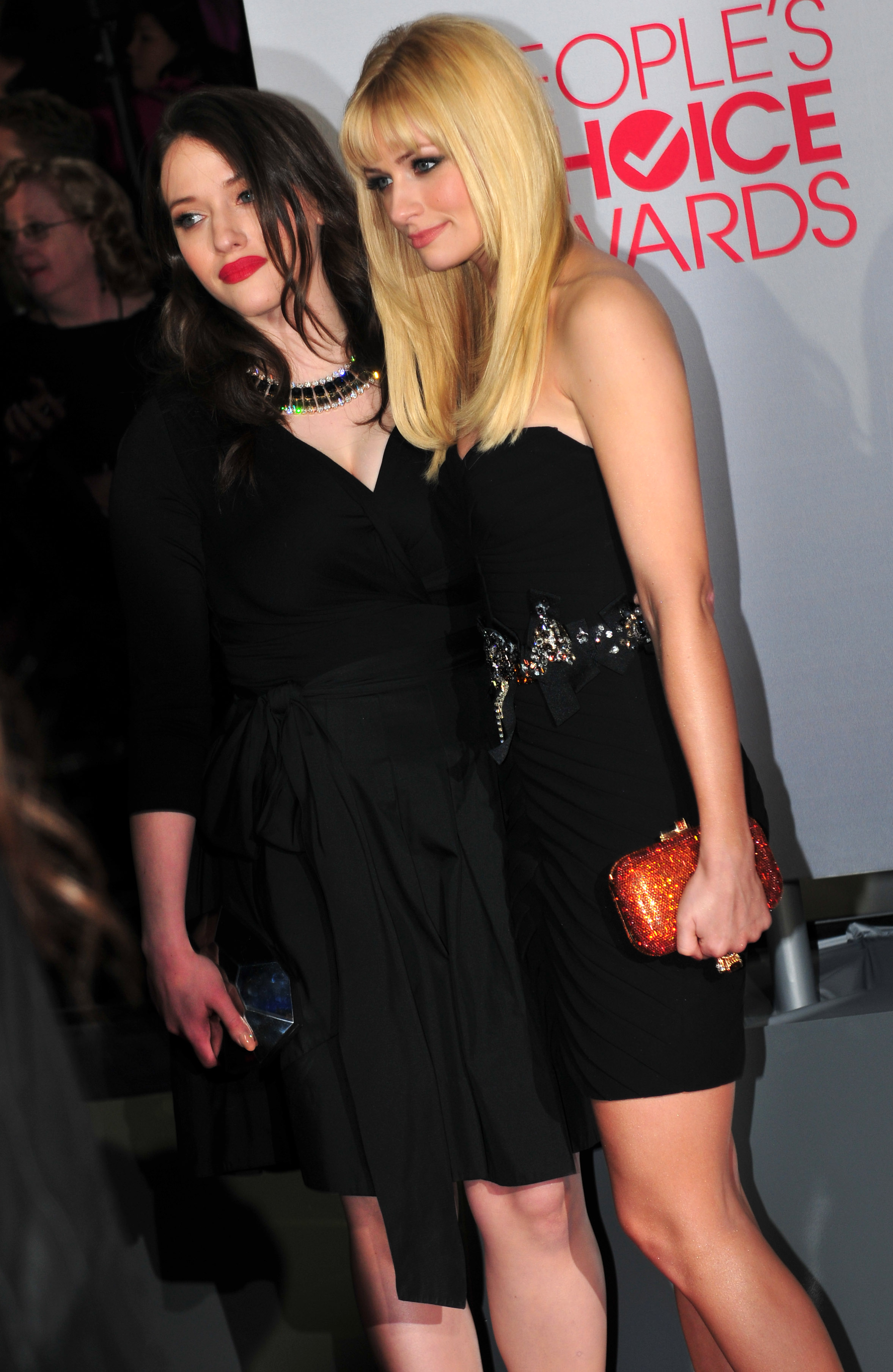
Dennings and Behrs at the 38th People's Choice Awards. January 2012.

2 Broke Girls received mixed reviews from critics. On Rotten Tomatoes the first season holds a rating of 63%, based on 43 reviews, with an average rating of 6.4/10. The site's critical consensus reads, "Kat Dennings and Beth Behrs have undeniable chemistry, and although 2 Broke Girls is at times bogged down by predictable jokes, this old-fashioned odd couple sitcom is rich with laughs." On Metacritic, the first season has a score of 66 out of 100, based on 26 critics, indicating "generally favorable reviews".

Much of the show's criticism focused on the perceived overuse of sexually based jokes and offensive racial stereotypes. Tim Goodman of The Hollywood Reporter said that the show had potential, but "squandered it away every week on cheap, predictable and unfunny jokes", and noted that many jokes were of a racist or sexual nature. New Zealand critic Chris Philpott was especially offended by the series' rape jokes in the first three episodes, calling the series the worst new show of 2012 and stating that it "display[ed] a lack of understanding and creativity on the part of the comedy writer." Andrew Ti, writing for Grantland.com, singled out Han Lee's portrayal as "a fairly regressive portrayal" of the stereotypical Asian male—"a tiny, greedy, sexless man-child with infantilized speech patterns." Elliot B. Gertel at Jewish World Review similarly found an episode of the show misrepresented Orthodox Jews. When asked about the racial stereotypes at a January 2012 press conference, Michael Patrick King said, "I don't find it offensive, any of this".

Emily Nussbaum of The New Yorker wrote that while the way the supporting characters are written is "so racist it is less offensive than baffling", she noted that the show has "so much potential", and compared it favorably to Cummings' other show Whitney. Positive reviews such as one from Entertainment Weekly focused on the "potential" that the series has based on the acting and chemistry between Dennings and Behrs. The series also received a B+ from The Boston Globe TV critic Matthew Gilbert, who was impressed with the casting and production: "The actresses – especially the Gwen Stefani-esque Dennings – transcend their types, and the pop-savvy humor has spirit thanks to producer Michael Patrick King from Sex and the City. After the forced opening minutes, it's the best multi-cam-com of the season." Writing weekly reviews of the series, The A.V. Club editor Emily VanDerWerff hoped that the series would improve but ultimately wrote: "Most of the problems—weird story construction, stereotypical characters, bad jokes—that have bedeviled the show have been there from the very beginning, though I will certainly say they've gotten worse as the season has gone along and the show hasn't bothered to diversify its rhythms at all."

In 2015, Rob Owen of the Pittsburgh Post-Gazette said what started out as "a modern Laverne & Shirley" attracted many young people to begin with, until they "realized it was a waste of their time."

The show appeared on many critics' "Worst of The Year" lists throughout its run.

=== Ratings ===
The series premiere was watched by 19.4 million viewers after its lead-in, the first episode of Two and a Half Men without Charlie Sheen. This marked the highest rating for a fall premiere of a comedy series since Fall 2001. It scored a 7.1 rating in Adults 18–49. With DVR viewers included, the premiere rose to over 21.5 million viewers and an 8.1 in adults 18–49. The show has done well in ratings with college students and young males.

Viewership and ratings per season of 2 Broke Girls
Season	Timeslot (ET)	Episodes	First aired		Last aired		TV season	Viewership rank	Avg. viewers (millions)	18–49 rank	Avg. 18–49 rating
Season	Timeslot (ET)	Episodes	Date	Viewers (millions)	Date	Viewers (millions)	TV season	Viewership rank	Avg. viewers (millions)	18–49 rank	Avg. 18–49 rating
1	Monday 9:30 pm (premiere); Monday 8:30 pm	24	September 19, 2011	19.37	May 7, 2012	8.99	2011–12	32	11.29	9	4.4/11
2	Monday 9:00 pm	24	September 24, 2012	10.14	May 13, 2013	8.94	2012–13	32	10.63	16 (Note: Tied with How I Met Your Mother.)	3.7/9
3	Monday 9:00 pm (1–3); Monday 8:30 pm (4–21); Monday 8:00 pm (22–24)	24	September 23, 2013	8.88	May 5, 2014	6.49	2013–14	37	8.98	21	3.8/10
4	Monday 8:00 pm	22	October 27, 2014	8.43	May 18, 2015	7.56	2014–15	48	9.14	35 (Note: Tied with The Last Man on Earth, American Idol – Wednesday and Chicago Fire.)	2.6
5	Thursday 9:30 pm (1–5, 12–22); Wednesday 8:00 pm (6–11)	22	November 12, 2015	6.34	May 12, 2016	6.99	2015–16	54	8.06	30 (Note: Tied with Little Big Shots, Chicago Med and Shades of Blue.)	2.3
6	Monday 9:00 pm (1–14); Monday 9:30 pm (15–22)	22	October 10, 2016	6.36	April 17, 2017	4.57	2016–17	52	7.03	43	1.8/6

== Accolades ==
Year	Award	Category	Recipients and nominees	Outcome
2012	People's Choice Awards	Favorite New TV Comedy	2 Broke Girls	Won
2012	Excellence in Production Design Award	Episode of a Multi-Camera, Variety or Unscripted Series	Glenda Rovello, Conny Boettger and Amy Feldman	Nominated
2012	Teen Choice Awards	Choice TV Breakout Performance – Female	Beth Behrs	Nominated
2012	Teen Choice Awards	Choice TV: Comedy	2 Broke Girls	Nominated
2012	Emmy Awards	Outstanding Art Direction for a Multi-Camera Series	Glenda Rovello and Amy Feldman (for "And the Rich People Problems", "And the Reality Check", "And the Pop Up Sale")	Won
2012	Emmy Awards	Outstanding Cinematography for a Multi-Camera Series	Gary Baum (for "Pilot")	Nominated
2012	Emmy Awards	Outstanding Multi-Camera Picture Editing for a Comedy Series	Darryl Bates (for "And the Kosher Cupcakes")	Nominated
2012	Casting Society of America Announces Artios Awards	Television Pilot Comedy	2 Broke Girls	Nominated
2013	Excellence in Production Design Award	Episode of a Multi-Camera, Variety or Unscripted Series	Glenda Rovello	Nominated
2013	NewNowNext Awards	Coolest Cameo	2 Chainz	Nominated
2013	Young Artist Award	Best Performance in a TV Series – Guest Starring Young Actor 11–13	Jake Elliott	Nominated
2013	Emmy Awards	Outstanding Art Direction for a Multi-Camera Series	Glenda Rovello and Amy Feldman (for "And the Bear Truth", "And Not So Sweet Charity", "And the Silent Partner")	Nominated
2013	Emmy Awards	Outstanding Cinematography for a Multi-Camera Series	Gary Baum (for "And the Psychic Shakedown")	Nominated
2014	People's Choice Awards	Favorite Network TV Comedy	2 Broke Girls	Nominated
2014	People's Choice Awards	Favorite TV Gal Pals	Caroline Channing (Beth Behrs) and Max Black (Kat Dennings)	Nominated
2014	Emmy Awards	Outstanding Cinematography for a Multi-Camera Series	Christian La Fountaine (for "And the Near Death Experience")	Nominated
2015	People's Choice Awards	Favorite Network TV Comedy	2 Broke Girls	Nominated
2015	Emmy Awards	Outstanding Production Design for a Narrative Program (Half-Hour or Less)	Glenda Rovello, Amy Feldman (for "And the Zero Tolerance", "And the Fun Factory", "And a Loan for Christmas")	Nominated
2015	Emmy Awards	Outstanding Multi-Camera Picture Editing for a Comedy Series	Darryl Bates and Ben Bosse (for "And the Move-In Meltdown")	Nominated
2015	Emmy Awards	Outstanding Cinematography for a Multi-Camera Series	Christian La Fountaine (for "And the Old Bike Yarn")	Nominated
2016	People's Choice Awards	Favorite Network TV Comedy	2 Broke Girls	Nominated
2016	Emmy Awards	Outstanding Multi-Camera Picture Editing for a Comedy Series	Darryl Bates (for "And the Sax Problems")	Nominated
2017	Emmy Awards	Outstanding Multi-Camera Picture Editing for a Comedy Series	Chris Poulos (for "And the Planes, Fingers and Automobiles")	Nominated
2017	Emmy Awards	Outstanding Cinematography for a Multi-Camera Series	Christian La Fountaine (for "And the Planes, Fingers and Automobiles")	Nominated

== Syndication ==
Reruns of 2 Broke Girls aired on TBS from 2015 to 2023.

== Home media ==
2 Broke Girls first became available on DVD in 2012 with the first season via Warner Bros. Home Entertainment, and was the only season to receive an additional Blu-ray release in countries United States, Canada and Australia. Subsequent seasons have received only a DVD release.

Title	Release dates			Additional
Title	Region 1	Region 2	Region 4	Additional
The Complete First Season	September 4, 2012	October 22, 2012	October 17, 2012	Features Set details: 24 episodes; 3-DVD set; 2-Blu-ray set; 1.78:1 aspect ratio; Subtitles: English SDH, French, Spanish; English: Dolby Digital 5.1 (DVD); English: DTS-HD Master Audio 5.1 (Blu-ray); Special features: 2 Girls Going 4 Broke; Behind the scenes with cast and creators; Unaired scenes; Blu-ray releases: Region A U.S. & Canada (September 4, 2012); Region B Australia (October 17, 2012)
The Complete Second Season	September 24, 2013	October 7, 2013	September 18, 2013	Features Set details: 24 episodes; 3-DVD set; 1.78:1 aspect ratio; Subtitles: English SDH, French, Spanish; English: Dolby Digital 5.1; Special features: Max's Homemade Cupcakes: Go Big or Go Broke!; Season 2 highlights and interviews; 2 Broke Girrllss! with Sophie Kachinsky; Cast and producers discuss the character; 2 Broke Girls at Paley Fest 2013; Highlights from the panel discussion; Unaired scenes; Gag reel
The Complete Third Season	October 14, 2014	October 6, 2014	October 22, 2014	Features Set details: 24 episodes; 3-DVD set; 1.78:1 aspect ratio; Subtitles: English SDH, French, Spanish; English: Dolby Digital 5.1; Special features: Unaired scenes; Gag reel
The Complete Fourth Season	August 11, 2015	October 12, 2015	November 4, 2015	Features Set details: 22 episodes; 3-DVD set; 1.78:1 aspect ratio; Subtitles: English SDH, French, Spanish; English: Dolby Digital 5.1; Special features: Unaired scenes; Gag reel
The Complete Fifth Season	September 20, 2016	October 10, 2016	February 1, 2017	Features Set details: 22 episodes; 3-DVD set; 1.78:1 aspect ratio; Subtitles: English SDH, French, Spanish; English: Dolby Digital 5.1; Special features: Unaired scenes; Gag reel
The Complete Sixth Season	October 3, 2017	No release	December 6, 2017	Features Set details: 22 episodes; 2-DVD set; 1.78:1 aspect ratio; Subtitles: English SDH, French, Spanish; English: Dolby Digital 5.1; Special features: Unaired scenes; Gag reel

Multiple season sets

Multiple DVD sets received releases in the United Kingdom and Australia, with the first three-season being made available in 2014. Two subsequent sets containing seasons one to four and seasons one to five were released exclusively only in Australia.

Title	Release dates			Additional
Title	Region 1	Region 2	Region 4	Additional
The Complete Seasons 1–3 Collection	No release	October 6, 2014	October 29, 2014	Features Set details: 72 episodes; 9-DVD-set; 1.78:1 aspect ratio; Subtitles: English SDH, French, Spanish; English: Dolby Digital 5.1; Special features: See individual releases
The Complete Seasons One – Four	No release	No release	November 4, 2015	Features Set details: 94 episodes; 12-DVD-set; 1.78:1 aspect ratio; Subtitles: English SDH, French, Spanish; English: Dolby Digital 5.1; Special features: See individual releases
The Complete Seasons One – Five	No release	No release	February 1, 2017	Features Set details: 116 episodes; 15-DVD-set; 1.78:1 aspect ratio; Subtitles: English SDH, French, Spanish; English: Dolby Digital 5.1; Special features: See individual releases
The Complete Series	October 3, 2017	November 13, 2017	December 6, 2017	Features Set details: 138 episodes; 17-DVD-set; 1.78:1 aspect ratio; Subtitles: English SDH, French, Spanish; English: Dolby Digital 5.1; Special features: See individual releases
