= She TV =

American sketch comedy television series

- Genre: Sketch comedy
- Created by: Tamara Rawitt
- Starring: Jennifer Coolidge; Linda Kash; Simbi Khali
- Country of origin: United States
- Original language: English
- No. of seasons: 1
- No. of episodes: 6

Production
- Executive producers: George Schlatter; Bonnie Turner; Terry Turner
- Production location: Los Angeles

Original release
- Network: ABC
- Release: August 16 – September 13, 1994

She TV is a short-lived sketch comedy television series that aired on ABC in 1994. The show was created by Tamara Rawitt, a producer on In Living Color, and featured a majority-women cast intended to distinguish it from male-dominated comedy shows of the time. The show was meant to "explore the female point of view" and satirize current events but was not, according to the show's producers, intended to be feminist.

During its run, She TV occupied a popular Tuesday night time slot normally reserved for the more serious police drama NYPD Blue. Only 5 episodes aired of a 6-episode order, but the show featured early starring roles for actors such as Jennifer Coolidge and Simbi Khali. The cast in general was unknown to the public and was drawn from the stand-up world, the Groundlings, and Second City. The show itself was produced by industry veterans and featured major guest stars such as Tony Curtis and Bea Arthur.

== Cast ==
- Jennifer Coolidge
- Linda Kash
- Simbi Khali
- Becky Thyre
- Linda Wallem
- Henriette Mantel
- Nick Bakay
- Carl Banks
- Elon Gold

== Reception ==
She TV received mixed reviews. Variety panned it as "[failing] to score on any level". The Chicago Tribune argued the show was "fenced in" by the standards of network television, and that its unwillingness to be overtly feminist made it feel "muted" and unappealing. A Time review, however, called the show a "breakthrough" and one of the best "in years," bemoaning the fact that it failed to find an audience.

Several explanations were offered for the show's failure beyond its quality. Comedy shows were uncommon to see as the last show in a network's primetime lineup, and audiences may have preferred dramas at that time.

The show may have also been too ambiguous in its mission, failing to either reach a broad audience or deliver fully on its women-centered premise. Critics speculated that the show's focus on a majority-women cast may have "scared off" male viewers. Comedian Jane Lynch joked about that possibility in her memoir, describing the show as "an all-female comedy teeming with fresh, new girl talent and writers—and so of course, it failed almost immediately."

Despite having a majority-women cast, other critics noted that it was only a slight majority (five of eight main cast members) and the show had numerous male writers. Wary of alienating male viewers, the show's producers may have failed to embrace a stronger and more provocative point of view. As one critic noted, She TV "wimps out" on its premise and is "just too nice."

After its cancellation, fans campaigned unsuccessfully to revive the show, arguing it was canceled due to misogynistic beliefs of network executives.

=== Rush Limbaugh outrage ===
Conservative talk-radio host Rush Limbaugh denounced She TV after the show aired a sketch mocking him as a racist. Limbaugh demanded an apology and retraction from ABC, which he did not receive, and also threatened a boycott of the network.
