= Jonathan Kite =

American actor

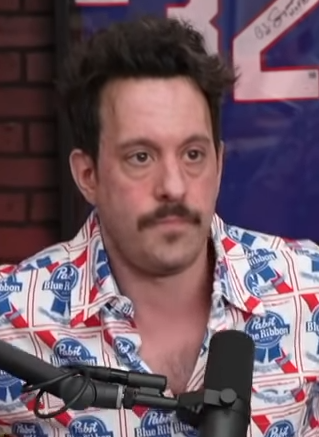
- Kite in 2021
- Born: September 2, 1979 (age 47); Skokie, Illinois, U.S.
- Education: University of Illinois Urbana-Champaign
- Occupations: Actor; comedian
- Years active: 2003–present

Jonathan Kite (born September 2, 1979) is an American actor, comedian and impressionist. He is best known for his role as Oleg Golishevsky on 2 Broke Girls.

== Life and career ==
Kite grew up in Skokie, Illinois, the son of Lynn and David Kite. He attended Old Orchard Junior High and Niles North High School. He has a theater degree from the University of Illinois Urbana-Champaign. His family is Jewish.

From 2011 to 2017, Kite co-starred on the CBS sitcom 2 Broke Girls, playing the role of Oleg Golishevsky, the creepy Ukrainian cook who works at the diner. Other television work includes guest roles on Raising Hope, Kickin' It, American Dad!, The Life & Times of Tim, In the Flow with Affion Crockett, and Wizards of Waverly Place. In addition, he also appeared in several commercials such as spots for AT&T and Muscle Milk.

As a stand-up comedian, Kite is best known for his impersonations, boasting over 120 celebrity impressions that include Vince Vaughn, Tom Hanks, Barack Obama, Donald Trump, Robert Downey Jr., Seth Rogen, Mark Wahlberg, Ian McKellen, Jeff Bridges, Anthony Bourdain, and Liam Neeson.

Outside of acting, Kite and his former 2 Broke Girls co-star Matthew Moy appeared on Hell's Kitchen when they attended dinner service in the Season 17 episode "Stars Heating Up Hell".

Kite voiced two characters in the animated show Cleopatra in Space: Octavian and Trumpet Guy.

== Filmography ==
=== Film ===
Year	Title	Role	Notes
2006	Pirates of the Caribbean: Dead Man's Chest	Black Pearl Pirate	Uncredited
2018	Smallfoot	Additional voices	
2021	Supercool	Uber Driver	
2022	The Curse of Bridge Hollow	Mr. Skinner	
2025	Sneaks	Whiz (voice)	
TBA	A.I. Heart U		

=== Television ===
Year	Title	Role	Notes
2003	Jimmy Kimmel Live!	Hacky Sack Hippie	Episode #1.81
2010	The Suite Life on Deck	Anterian	Episode: "Starship Tipton"
2010	Wizards of Waverly Place	Agent Lamwood	Episode: "Wizards Exposed"
2010	Raising Hope	Lucy's Original Boyfriend	Episode: "Pilot"
2011	I'm in the Band	Phil	Episode: "Happy Fun Metal Rock Time"
2011	Kickin' It	Terrence	Episode: "The Commercial"
2011	In the Flow with Affion Crockett	Various	4 episodes
2011–2017	2 Broke Girls	Oleg	Main role
2012	The Life & Times of Tim	Hugh Jackman (voice)	Episode: "Pudding Boy/The Celebrity Who Shall Remain Nameless"
2012, 2014	Black Dynamite	Various roles	Additional voices, 8 episodes
2014	American Dad!	(voice)	Episode: "Familyland"
2017	NCIS	Chet Goodman	Episode: "Double Down"
2017	Family Guy	Alec Baldwin (voice)	Episode: "Emmy-Winning Episode"
2018	The Boss Baby: Back in Business	Police Officer (voice)	Episodes: "Scooter Buskie" and "Family Fun Night"
2020–2021	Cleopatra in Space	Octavian (voice)	Recurring role, 9 episodes
2021	Dad Stop Embarrassing Me!	Johnny	Main role
2021	M.O.D.O.K.	Tatterdemalion (voice)	3 episodes
2024	Blue Bloods	Thomas Reims	Episode: "Without Fear or Favor"
2025	Family Guy	Christopher Walken (voice)	Episode: "One Foot in Front of the Mother"
2026	Ghosts	Boris	Episode: "Woodstone Royale"

=== Video games ===
Year	Title	Role	Notes
2011	Red Faction: Armageddon		
