= Jennifer Coolidge =

American actress (born 1961)

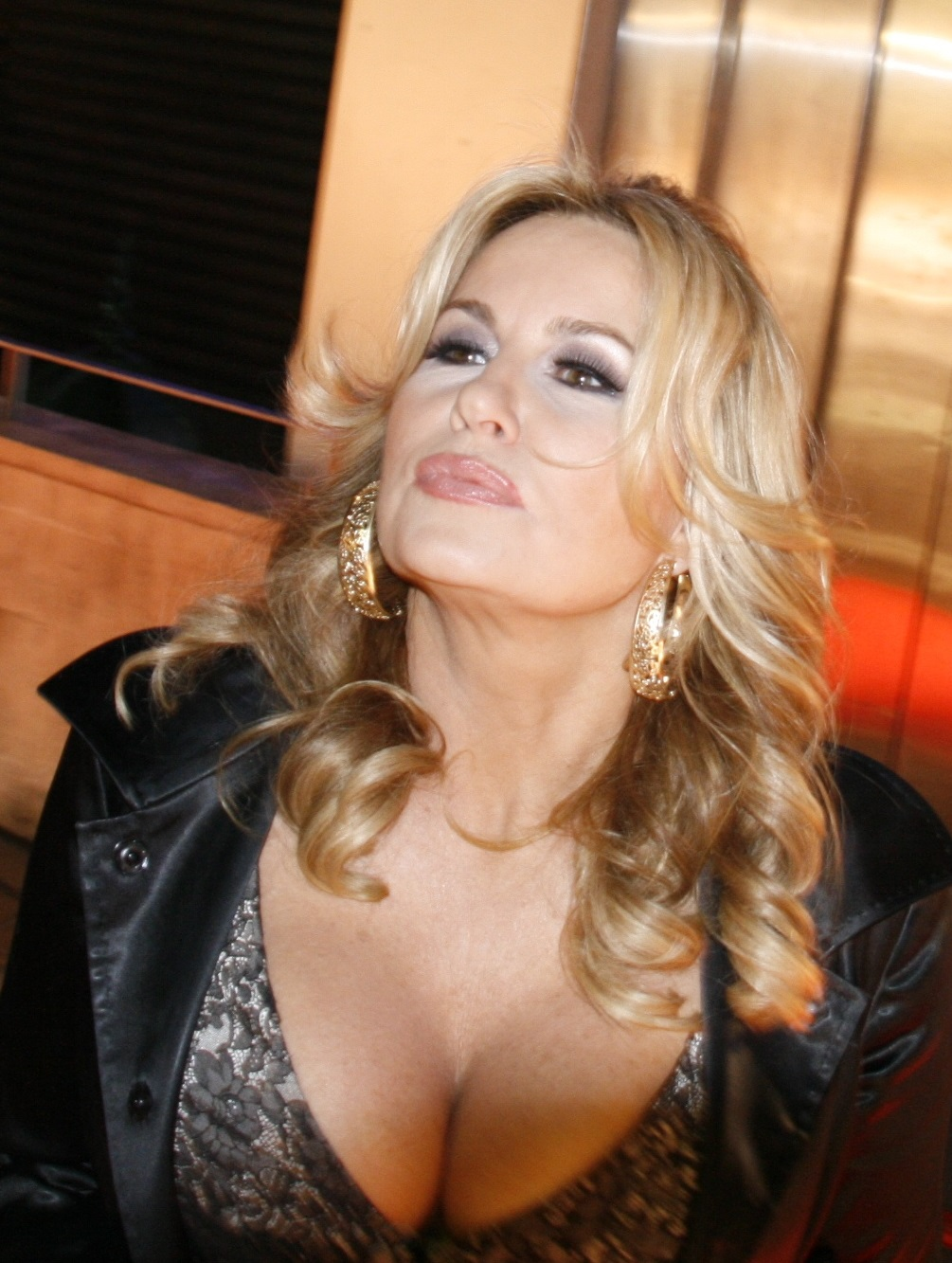
- Coolidge in 2012
- Born: August 28, 1961 (age 65); Boston, Massachusetts, U.S.
- Education: Emerson College (BA); American Academy of Dramatic Arts (MFA)
- Occupation: Actress
- Years active: 1993–present

Jennifer Coolidge (born August 28, 1961) is an American actress. She gained recognition for her comedic roles, including the American Pie (1999–2012) and Legally Blonde (2001–2003) film series.

Coolidge's other film credits include Pootie Tang (2001), A Cinderella Story (2004), Click (2006), Date Movie (2006), Epic Movie (2007), Promising Young Woman (2020), Single All the Way (2021), Shotgun Wedding (2022), and A Minecraft Movie (2025). She collaborated with Christopher Guest on four of his mockumentary films: Best in Show (2000), A Mighty Wind (2003), For Your Consideration (2006), and Mascots (2016).

On television, Coolidge has appeared in the sitcoms Joey (2004–2006) and 2 Broke Girls (2011–2017), as well as the drama series The Secret Life of the American Teenager (2008–2012) and The Watcher (2022). She garnered critical acclaim for her role as Tanya McQuoid in the first two seasons of the HBO anthology series The White Lotus (2021–2022), winning two Primetime Emmy Awards and a Golden Globe. In 2023, she was included in the annual Time 100 list of the most influential people in the world.

== Early life and education ==
Coolidge was born in Boston, on August 28, 1961, and raised in Norwell, Massachusetts. As a child, she played the clarinet and attended orchestra camp for three summers.

She attended Norwell High School in Norwell and Cambridge School of Weston in Weston, Massachusetts, and then Emerson College in Boston and the American Academy of Dramatic Arts in New York City. During college, Coolidge aspired to be a dramatic actress similar to Meryl Streep, but instead pursued comedic character acting. As a student at the American Academy of Dramatic Arts, Coolidge worked as a waitress in a restaurant alongside Sandra Bullock, who also aspired to be an actress.

== Career ==
=== 1993–1999: Early career ===
Coolidge made her first television appearance in the November 1993 Seinfeld episode "The Masseuse". In 1994, she was a regular on She TV, a short-lived sketch comedy that also featured Nick Bakay, Elon Gold, Simbi Khali, and Linda Kash. She had small roles appearing in such films as Not of This Earth, A Bucket of Blood, Plump Fiction, and A Night at the Roxbury. She also voiced Luanne's beauty school teacher, Miss Kremzer, in a recurring role on King of the Hill. She worked with The Groundlings, an improv and sketch comedy troupe based in Los Angeles. In June 1995, Coolidge unsuccessfully auditioned for Saturday Night Live.

=== 1999–2006: Film breakthrough ===
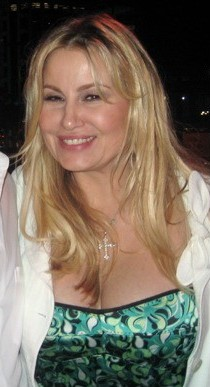
Coolidge in 2005

In 1999, Coolidge got her big break playing Jeanine Stifler, or "Stifler's mom" in American Pie. The film was a box-office hit and grossed $235 million worldwide. In 2001, she played Ireenie in the film Pootie Tang. Later in that same year, she reprised her role as Stifler's Mom in American Pie 2, and had a supporting role in Legally Blonde as Paulette Bonafonté Parcelle the manicurist. Legally Blonde was a box-office hit, grossing US$96 million domestically. The film's box-office success led to her reprising the role in its 2003 sequel, Legally Blonde 2: Red, White & Blonde, but the movie was not as financially successful as the first and generated mostly negative reviews. In 2003, she again played Stifler's Mom in American Wedding.

In 2003, she played the protagonist's agent Luise in Testosterone filmed in Argentina starring David Sutcliffe as Dean Seagrave and Antonio Sabato, Jr., as Pablo. In 2004, she had a supporting role in the romantic comedy A Cinderella Story playing Hilary Duff's character's vain, self-absorbed stepmother. The film went on to become a moderate box office hit despite negative critical reviews.

She has appeared in 2001 on Frasier as Frederica, Martin Crane's new physical therapist, in 2003–2004 in 3 episodes of According to Jim, playing Roxanne, Jim's sister, and in 2003 in an episode of Sex and the City. Coolidge nearly received the role of Lynette Scavo on Desperate Housewives, but it eventually went to Felicity Huffman.

In 2003, she starred in an episode of Friends in its final season as Amanda, an obnoxious acquaintance whom Phoebe Buffay and Monica Geller try to shake off. From 2004 to 2006, Coolidge had a role in the NBC comedy series Joey as Joey Tribbiani's oversexed agent Roberta "Bobbie" Morganstern. During its second season, she went from a recurring character to a more prominent role, appearing in 37 out of 46 episodes in the series. NBC officially canceled the series in May 2006, citing low ratings.

Coolidge also appeared in 1998 in the children's comedy Slappy and the Stinkers, and as the voice of Aunt Fanny in the animated feature Robots in 2005. The film was accompanied by an original short animated film based on Robots, titled Aunt Fanny's Tour of Booty, in which she reprised her role. In late 2005, Coolidge was invited to join the Academy of Motion Picture Arts and Sciences. From 2000 to 2006 she played comic parts in the improv mockumentaries Best in Show, A Mighty Wind, and For Your Consideration, all directed by Christopher Guest.

=== 2006–2011: Television roles ===
In 2006, she guest starred on an episode of Top Chef, and played Adam Sandler's wife's friend, Janine, in the comedy film Click. She appeared in the 2006 film Date Movie as a spoof of Barbra Streisand's Meet the Fockers character. The film received unfavorable critic reviews and Rotten Tomatoes ranked the film 77th in the 100 worst reviewed films of the 2000s, with a rating of 6%. However, Variety did praise Coolidge for providing a few bright moments with a spot-on spoof of Streisand, albeit otherwise unimpressed describing the film as "padded and repetitious".

Epic Movie, released in 2007 and made by the same people behind Date Movie, was the first movie in which she received a starring role. In the film she played the "White Bitch" (the White Witch) of Gnarnia (Narnia), a lampoon of the Disney and Walden Media film The Chronicles of Narnia: The Lion, the Witch and the Wardrobe. A. O. Scott of The New York Times called the film "irreverent and also appreciative, dragging its satiric prey down to the lowest pop-cultural denominator" and added, "The humor is coarse and occasionally funny. The archly bombastic score ... is the only thing you might call witty. But happily, Jennifer Coolidge and Fred Willard show up ... to add some easy, demented class."

During 2007, Coolidge appeared on Thank God You're Here and The Closer, on TNT. In 2008, she guest-starred on The Secret Life of the American Teenager as a call girl. In the second season, she was a frequently recurring character, now playing the fiancé of Ben's dad and future stepmother of Ben. She also starred in the 2008 Lifetime Television film Living Proof. Coolidge appeared in the 2008 film Soul Men as Rosalee.

In 2009, Coolidge took a dramatic role in Bad Lieutenant: Port of Call New Orleans as Genevieve McDonagh. The film premiered on September 9, 2009, at the 66th Venice International Film Festival, and it opened in general release in the United States on November 20, 2009. Also In 2009, she starred alongside Heather Graham and Amber Heard in ExTerminators, a black comedy about a set of women who form their own "silent revolution", wreaking havoc on the abusive men in their lives.

In 2010, Coolidge appeared in another film starring Hilary Duff titled Beauty & the Briefcase, an ABC Family television film produced by Image Entertainment that originally aired on April 18, 2010. It was based on the novel Diary of a Working Girl by Daniella Brodsky. The film was released on DVD and Blu-ray in the US on February 8, 2011.

=== 2011–2019: 2 Broke Girls and stand-up comedy ===
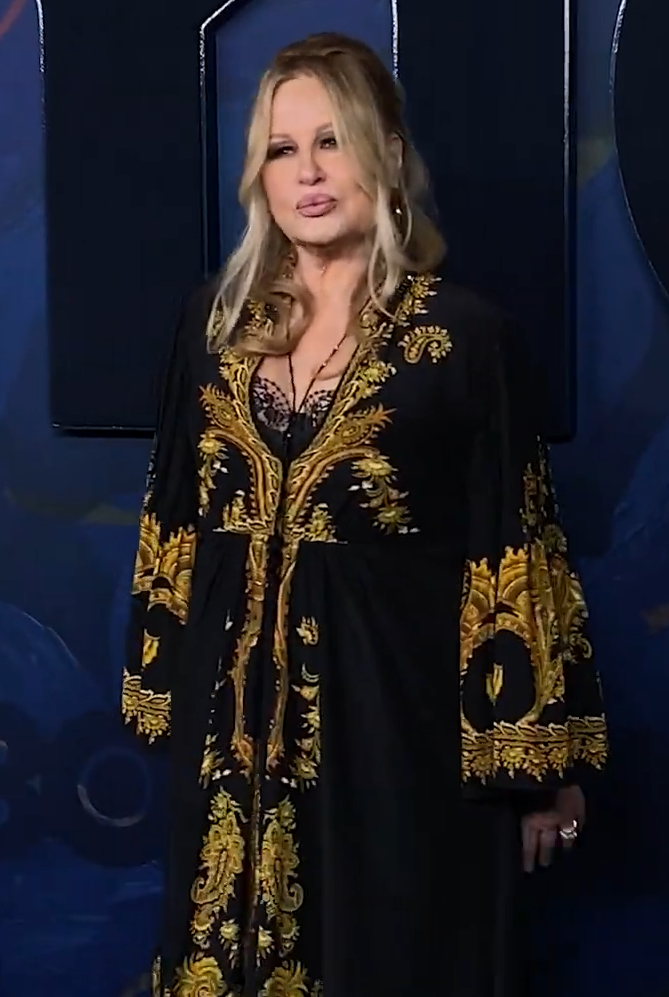
Coolidge at the 75th Primetime Emmy Awards

In June 2011, Coolidge curated a Blake Nelson Boyd art show in New Orleans. In the same month Coolidge began to do standup comedy. She hosted the "Women in Film" at the Beverly Hills Hotel. It went well, and she decided to take an act on the road. Coolidge ended up doing shows all over the world for two years, Scotland included. Coolidge told Australian radio show The Kyle & Jackie O Show that she would be touring Australia as part of her Yours for the Night stand-up tour. In October 2011, Coolidge began a recurring role in the CBS sitcom 2 Broke Girls as Zofia "Sophie" Kaczyński, a Polish neighbor of the two lead characters; she was later promoted to main cast from season 2 up until the show's cancellation in 2017.

Coolidge reprised her role as Jeanine Stifler in an American Pie sequel American Reunion which opened in North America on April 6, 2012. The following year, additional voice cast members were announced for B.O.O.: Bureau of Otherworldly Operations, including Coolidge as Carol Sue, a transitions-relations officer. Film distributor 20th Century Fox set November 6, 2015, for the film's release date (which was moved a few months later up to September 25), However, Los Angeles Times reported in 2014 that the film had been delayed again with no replacement release date set. It was reported the film's concept has gone back to development.

Coolidge and actress Megan Mullally joined the cast of Alexander and the Terrible, Horrible, No Good, Very Bad Day in 2013; Coolidge plays Ms. Suggs, the driving instructor. The film was released in North America on October 10, 2014. The next year, she had a voice role in Hell and Back, and had a cameo in Alvin and the Chipmunks: The Road Chip. In 2016, she appeared in Mascots, directed by Christopher Guest. In 2017, Coolidge lent her voice to portray Mary Meh in The Emoji Movie. In 2018, Coolidge made an appearance in Ariana Grande's music video for her song "Thank U, Next", which brought her renewed recognition.

=== 2020–present: The White Lotus and continued film roles ===
In 2020, she starred in Like a Boss, the first studio comedy film of the 2020s, for Paramount Pictures, co-starring with Tiffany Haddish, Rose Byrne, and Salma Hayek. Coolidge had a supporting role in Emerald Fennell's directorial debut Promising Young Woman as the mother of Carey Mulligan's character, Cassie. The movie received universal acclaim upon release.

In October 2020, Coolidge was cast as Tanya McQuoid, a troubled wealthy woman on vacation, in Mike White's comedy-drama series The White Lotus and began filming shortly after in Hawaii. The show premiered in July 2021 and was widely acclaimed, with Daniel D'Addario of Variety calling it the "role of a lifetime" and deeming Coolidge a "Hollywood MVP". She won a Primetime Emmy Award for Outstanding Supporting Actress in a Limited or Anthology Series or Movie for her performance. Coolidge reprised her role for the second season, and received a second Emmy Award for Outstanding Supporting Actress in a Drama Series for the role at the 75th Emmy Awards.

In 2021, Coolidge starred in the Netflix Christmas romantic comedy Single All the Way alongside Michael Urie, Philemon Chambers, and Kathy Najimy. The following year, she starred in Netflix's mini-series The Watcher along with Naomi Watts and Bobby Cannavale, and starred in the action-comedy film Shotgun Wedding.

In 2024, Coolidge starred in and executive produced Dito Montiel's comedy film Riff Raff. She told Forbes that, when she was offered the role, "I've never been offered a part like her. [...] There's a certain woman that I've played quite a few times - some sort of rich, spoiled woman or something, but this was something very different. This was someone who had a pretty decent beginning of her life, but ended up not desired by her ex-husband anymore and very lost." In 2025, she starred in the adventure comedy film A Minecraft Movie.

== Public image ==
Coolidge is widely considered a gay icon, often impersonated by drag queens, with Coolidge noting in 2021 that she surrounded herself socially with gay men and women from a young age. Coolidge has also long been vocal about her support for the LGBTQ+ community.

Coolidge was included on Time's "The 100 Most Influential People of 2023", and was featured on the magazine cover for the issue. She also hosted the 2023 Time 100 gala. In February 2023, Coolidge was named Woman of the Year by Harvard's Hasty Pudding Theatricals.

== Personal life ==
Coolidge dated Swedish model Rafael Edholm in the 1980s, living together in New York and attending acting classes. She later dated comedian Chris Kattan.

In 2005, after having visited New Orleans up to ten times a year over ten years, Coolidge purchased a house there, which was featured in some of the interior scenes in The Beguiled (2017).

Her charitable work and activism includes supporting AIDS assistance and animal rights. Coolidge tries to follow a plant-based lifestyle. Coolidge was crowned PETA's "Vegan Queen" in 2023. She has also adopted a dog named Chuy that was rescued from a meat factory in Korea.

== Filmography ==
=== Film ===
Year	Title	Role	Notes
1995	Not of This Earth	Nurse	
1995	A Bucket of Blood	Stupid girl	
1995	Love and Happiness	Jeringir	
1997	Plump Fiction	Sister Sister	
1997	Trial and Error	Jacqueline "Jackie" Turreau	
1998	Slappy and the Stinkers	Harriet	
1998	A Night at the Roxbury	Hottie police officer	
1998	Brown's Requiem	Helen	
1999	Austin Powers: The Spy Who Shagged Me	Woman at football game	
1999	American Pie	Jeanine Stifler	
2000	The Broken Hearts Club: A Romantic Comedy	Betty	
2000	Best in Show	Sherri Ann Cabot	
2001	Down to Earth	Mrs. Belinda Wellington	
2001	Pootie Tang	Ireenie	
2001	Legally Blonde	Paulette Bonafonté	
2001	American Pie 2	Jeanine Stifler	Uncredited cameo
2001	Zoolander	American designer	
2003	A Mighty Wind	Amber Cole	
2003	As Virgins Fall	Janice Denver	
2003	Carolina	Aunt Marilyn	
2003	Legally Blonde 2: Red, White & Blonde	Paulette Bonafonté Parcelle	
2003	American Wedding	Jeanine Stifler	
2003	Testosterone	Louise	
2004	A Cinderella Story	Fiona Montgomery	
2004	Lemony Snicket's A Series of Unfortunate Events	White-Faced Woman #1	
2005	Robots	Aunt Fanny (voice)	
2006	Date Movie	Roz Funkyerdoder	
2006	American Dreamz	Martha Kendoo	
2006	Click	Janine	
2006	For Your Consideration	Whitney Taylor Brown	
2007	Epic Movie	The White Bitch of Gnarnia	
2008	Dr. Dolittle: Tail to the Chief	Daisy (voice)	Direct-to-DVD
2008	Foreign Exchange	Principal Lonnatini	
2008	Igor	Jaclyn / Heidi (voice)	
2008	Soul Men	Rosalee	
2009	ExTerminators	Stella	
2009	A Good Funeral	Helen	
2009	Bad Lieutenant: Port of Call New Orleans	Genevieve McDonagh	
2009	Gentlemen Broncos	Judith Purvis	
2010	The Jack of Spades	Monica	
2010	Beauty & the Briefcase	Felisa McCollin	
2011	Mangus!	Cookie Richardson	
2012	American Reunion	Jeanine Stifler	
2013	Austenland	Miss Elizabeth Charming	
2014	Alexander and the Terrible, Horrible, No Good, Very Bad Day	Ms. Mary Suggs	
2015	Hell and Back	Durmessa (voice)	
2015	Alvin and the Chipmunks: The Road Chip	Mrs. Joan Price	Cameo
2016	Mascots	Jolene Lumpkin	
2017	The Emoji Movie	Mary Meh (voice)	
2020	Like a Boss	Sydney	
2020	Promising Young Woman	Susan Thomas	
2020	Bobbleheads: The Movie	Binky (voice)	Direct-to-video
2021	Swan Song	Dee Dee Dale	
2021	Arlo the Alligator Boy	Stucky (voice)	
2021	Single All the Way	Aunt Sandy	
2022	Shotgun Wedding	Carol Fowler	
2023	We Have a Ghost	Judy Romano	
2024	Riff Raff	Ruth	Also executive producer
2025	A Minecraft Movie	Vice Principal Marlene	
2026	Girl Group	TBA	Completed
2027	A Minecraft Movie Squared	Vice Principal Marlene	Filming

=== Television ===
Year	Title	Role	Notes
1993	Seinfeld	Jodi	Episode: "The Masseuse"
1994	She TV	Various	Main cast
1995	The Monroes	Marcia Kelly	Episode: "Educating Billy"
1996	Saturday Night Special	Various	Main cast
1997–1999	King of the Hill	Miss June Kremzer (voice)	4 episodes
1998	Alright Already	Rhonda	Episode: "Again with the Hockey Player: Part 1"
1998	Rude Awakening	Sue	2 episodes
1998	Men in White	—N/a	Television film
1999	Ladies Man	Helen	Episode: "Neutered Jimmy"
2001	The Andy Dick Show	Nancy Bunting	Episode: "Kid Krist"
2001	Frasier	Frederica	Episode: "Forgotten But Not Gone"
2001	Sketch Pad	The Groundlings	Main cast
2002	Do Over	Gwen Brody	Episode: "Cold War"
2002	Women vs. Men	Shelly	Television film
2003	Sex and the City	Victoria	Episode: "The Perfect Present"
2003	Friends	Amanda Buffamonteezi	Episode: "The One with Ross's Tan"
2003–2004	According to Jim	Roxanne	3 episodes
2004	Game Over	Ramona (voice)	Episode: "Into the Woods"
2004	MADtv	Herself / Ivanka	Season 9, episode 23
2004	Father of the Pride	Tracy (voice)	Episode: "And the Revolution Continues"
2004	As Told by Ginger	Nikki Laporte (voice)	Episode: "The Wedding Frame"
2004–2006	Joey	Roberta "Bobbie" Morganstern	Main cast; 37 episodes
2005	Hopeless Pictures	Traci (voice)	3 episodes
2006	Comic Relief 2006	"Fur"	Stand-up comedy benefit concert in the wake of Hurricane Katrina
2007–2009	Nip/Tuck	Candy Richards / CoCo	3 episodes
2008	The Closer	Angie Serabian	Episode: "Dial M for Provenza"
2008	Rick & Steve: The Happiest Gay Couple in All the World	Fannie Mae (voice)	Episode: "Mom Fight"
2008	Living Proof	Tish	Television film
2008–2009	Yin Yang Yo!	Coop's mother (voice)	4 episodes
2008–2012	The Secret Life of the American Teenager	Betty	35 episodes
2009	Kath & Kim	Lenore	Episode: "Celebrity"
2009	Party Down	Bobbie St. Brown	2 episodes
2010; 2012	The Life & Times of Tim	Various voices	3 episodes
2010–2013	Hero Factory	Daniella Capricorn (voice)	5 episodes
2011–2014	Fish Hooks	Ms. Lynne Lips (voice)	Recurring
2012	The Game	Marissa	Episode: "Skeletons"
2012	Napoleon Dynamite	Mrs. Jane Moser (voice)	2 episodes
2012–2016	Gravity Falls	"Lazy" Susan Wentworth (voice)	Recurring
2012–2017	2 Broke Girls	Sophie Kaczyński	Recurring (season 1); main cast (seasons 2–6) 122 episodes
2015	Glee	Whitney S. Pierce	2 episodes
2015	Inside Amy Schumer	Cleopatricia Sherman	Episode: "Babies and Bustiers"
2015	TripTank	Mom (voice)	Episode: "Steve's Family"
2017	American Dad!	Caroline (voice)	Episode: "A Whole Slotta Love"
2018–2022	The Loud House	Myrtle (voice)	5 episodes
2019	The Cool Kids	Bonnie	Episode: "Sid's Ex-Wife"
2020	Royalties	Miriam Hale	3 episodes
2020–2021	The Fungies!	Dr. Nancy (voice)	Regular role
2021	Rick and Morty	Daphne (voice)	Episode: "A Rickconvenient Mort"
2021	I Heart Arlo	Stucky (voice)	3 episodes
2021	Ten Year Old Tom	Dakota's Mom (voice)	5 episodes
2021	Last Week Tonight with John Oliver	Herself	1 episode
2021–2022	The White Lotus	Tanya McQuoid	Main cast (seasons 1–2)
2022	The Watcher	Karen Calhoun	7 episodes
2024	Monsters at Work	Marilyn	2 episodes

=== Video games ===
Year	Title	Role	Notes
2005	Robots	Aunt Fanny/ fan	Voice

=== Music videos ===
Year	Title	Artist	Role	Ref.
2018	"Thank U, Next"	Ariana Grande	Paulette Bonafonté	

=== Stage ===
Year	Title	Role	Venue	Notes
2001–2002	The Women	Edith Potter	American Airlines Theatre	77 performances
2010	Elling	Reidun Nordsletten / Gunn / Poet / Johanne	Ethel Barrymore Theatre	9 performances
2015	Saving Kitty	Kate	Central Square Theatre	

== Awards and nominations ==
Association	Year	Work	Category	Result	Ref.
AACTA International Awards	2022	The White Lotus	Best Actress in a Series	Nominated	
AACTA International Awards	2023	The White Lotus	Best Actress in a Series	Won	
AARP Movies for Grownups Awards	2024	The White Lotus	Best Actress (TV/Streaming)	Won	
Actor Awards	2022	The White Lotus	Outstanding Performance by a Female Actor in a Miniseries or Television Movie	Nominated	
Actor Awards	2023	The White Lotus	Outstanding Performance by a Female Actor in a Drama Series	Won	
Actor Awards	2023	The White Lotus	Outstanding Performance by an Ensemble in a Drama Series	Won	
Critics' Choice Awards	2022	The White Lotus	Best Supporting Actress in a Limited Series or Movie Made for Television	Won	
Critics' Choice Awards	2023	The White Lotus	Best Supporting Actress in a Drama Series	Won	
Critics' Choice Super Awards	2023	The Watcher	Best Actress in a Horror Series	Nominated	
Dorian Awards	2022	The White Lotus	Best Supporting TV Performance	Won	
Dorian Awards	2022	—	Wilde Artist Award	Nominated	
Dorian Awards	2022	—	Wilde Wit Award	Won	
Dorian Awards	2023	The White Lotus	Best Supporting TV Performance – Drama	Won	
Drama Desk Awards	2003	The Women	Outstanding Featured Actress in a Play	Nominated	
Elliot Norton Awards	2016	Saving Kitty	Outstanding Actress, Midsize Theater	Won	
Florida Film Critics Circle Awards	2004	A Mighty Wind	Best Cast	Won	
Golden Globes	2022	The White Lotus	Best Supporting Actress – Series, Miniseries or Television Film	Nominated	
Golden Globes	2023	The White Lotus	Best Supporting Actress – Limited or Anthology Series or Television Film	Won	
Gotham Awards	2006	For Your Consideration	Best Ensemble Cast	Nominated	
Gotham Awards	2021	The White Lotus	Outstanding Performance in a New Series	Nominated	
Hasty Pudding Theatricals Awards	2023	—	Woman of the Year	Won	
Hollywood Critics Association TV Awards	2022	The White Lotus	Best Supporting Actress in a Broadcast or Cable Limited, Anthology Series, or Movie	Won	
Hollywood Critics Association TV Awards	2023	The White Lotus	Best Supporting Actress in a Broadcast Network or Cable Drama Series	Nominated	
MTV Movie & TV Awards	2023	Shotgun Wedding	Best Comedic Performance	Nominated	
MTV Movie & TV Awards	2023	The White Lotus	Most Frightened Performance	Won	
MTV Movie & TV Awards	2023	—	Comedic Genius Award	Won	
Primetime Emmy Awards	2022	The White Lotus	Outstanding Supporting Actress in a Limited or Anthology Series or Movie	Won	
Primetime Emmy Awards	2023	The White Lotus	Outstanding Supporting Actress in a Drama Series	Won	
Provincetown International Film Festival Awards	2015	—	Faith Hubley Memorial Award	Won	
Satellite Awards	2024	The White Lotus	Best Actress in a Television Series – Musical or Comedy	Won	
Stinkers Bad Movie Awards	2006	Date Movie	Most Annoying Fake Accent – Female	Nominated	
Teen Choice Awards	2005	A Cinderella Story	Choice Movie: Sleazebag	Won	
