= Matthew Moy =

American actor (born 1984)

- Born: Matthew James Moy; February 3, 1984 (age 42); San Francisco, California, U.S.
- Education: University of California, Davis
- Occupations: Actor; artist
- Years active: 2008–present
- Height: 5 ft 1 in (155 cm)

Matthew James Moy (born February 3, 1984) is an American actor. He co-starred as Han Lee on the CBS sitcom 2 Broke Girls and provides the voice of Lars Barriga on Steven Universe and Steven Universe Future.

== Early life and education ==
Moy was born and raised in San Francisco, California. Moy is a fourth-generation Chinese-American. He attended the University of California, Davis, graduating with a bachelor's degree in Japanese and a minor in linguistics. Moy's father was a high school teacher, while his mother was a language therapist. He has one older sister.

== Career ==
=== Television ===
Moy has appeared on several television shows, including How I Met Your Mother, Criminal Minds, Zeke and Luther, Good Luck Charlie, and Kickin' It, and had a recurring role as Shawn the Mathlete on iCarly. He played Trang in the ninth season of the sitcom Scrubs. He has also made guest star appearances on Big Time Rush as famous blogger Deke and on The Middle as Takayuki, the Heck family's Japanese foreign exchange student. He appeared on the fifth episode of the Syfy reality game show Cha$e and voices Lars Barriga on the Cartoon Network animated series Steven Universe, a role which has earned him critical praise.

Moy co-starred as Han Lee on the CBS sitcom 2 Broke Girls, from 2011 to 2017. Moy's character was criticized by writer Andrew Ti as perpetuating "every possible Yellow Panic stereotype with an actually fairly impressive level of thoroughness" and his use of broken English was characterized as being played "like some sorry minstrel show." Moy responded to criticism by stating that "[w]e're a comedy, and we often go right to the edge. It doesn't bother me. I've encountered this all my life. I've been made fun of all my life." In July 2017, Moy was cast as Zack Smith/Microbe in New Warriors on Freeform. While a pilot was filmed, Freeform dropped the series and it was ultimately cancelled after languishing for a year.

=== Film ===
Moy played Ron, Grover's best friend, in the 2010 independent film The Grover Complex. He played Chuck in the 2011 film No Strings Attached opposite Ashton Kutcher and Natalie Portman.

=== Video games ===
Moy voiced Firefly in the 2009 video game G.I. Joe: The Rise of Cobra, Raus in White Knight Chronicles, and Shroomboom in the Skylanders reboot of the franchise.

=== Artwork ===
When not acting, Moy enjoys drawing and painting. He has credited Rebecca Sugar with giving him additional painting lessons during his time on Steven Universe.

== Personal life ==
In 2012, while filming the second season of 2 Broke Girls, Moy unknowingly suffered a minor stroke in his sleep, causing weakness and motor skill loss in his right side. He drove himself to urgent care, and doctors discovered bleeding in his brain, but no further deterioration. The loss of motor skills in Moy's right side required a year of physical therapy, including walking with a cane for assistance on sets and re-learning to write with his right hand; he has since made a full recovery. Moy kept the incident private from media until 2017.

== Filmography ==
Film
Year	Title	Role	Notes
2009	Non Sequitur	Dallas	Short film
2010	The Grover Complex	Ron	
2011	No Strings Attached	Chuck	
2011	Accidentally in Love	Adam	Television film
2012	FDR: American Badass!	Officer Nguyen	
2014	The Future of Dough	Darren	Short film
2015	Unreal Estate	The stranger	
2019	White Snake	Dudou	English dub
2019	Lucky	Security Gnome (voice)	Television film
2020	Exorcism at 60,000 Feet	Thang	

Television
Year	Title	Role	Notes
2008	Mind of Mencia	Short man	Season 4, episode 8
2009–2010	iCarly	Shawn	3 episodes
2009	Tim and Eric Awesome Show, Great Job!	Party guest	Episode: "Hair"
2009	How I Met Your Mother	Louis	Episode: "The Window"
2009–2010	Scrubs	Trang	6 episodes
2010	Criminal Minds	Eric	Episode: "The Uncanny Valley"
2010	Zeke and Luther	School reporter	Episode: "Skate Squad"
2010	Big Time Rush	Deke	Episode: "Big Time Blogger"
2010	Good Luck Charlie	Usher	Episode: "Butt Dialing Duncans"
2010	The Middle	Takayuki	Episode: "Foreign Exchange"
2011–2017	2 Broke Girls	Han Lee	Main cast
2012	Kickin' It	Shen	Episode: "Kickin' It in China"
2013	Kung Fu Panda: Legends of Awesomeness	Master Yijiro (voice)	Episode: "The Way of the Prawn"
2013–2019	Steven Universe	Lars Barriga, Fox Man, Voltron (voice)	Recurring role
2016	Bubble Guppies	Ping (voice)	Episode: "The New Year's Dragon!"
2017	Voltron: Legendary Defender	Vakala (voice)	Episode: "The Journey"
2018	Hell's Kitchen	Himself	Guest diner; Episode: "Stars Heating Up Hell"
2018	New Warriors	Zachary Smith/Microbe	Television pilot
2019	Steven Universe: The Movie	Lars Barriga (voice)	Television film
2019	Steven Universe Future	Lars Barriga (voice)	Episode: "Little Graduation"
2022	Alice's Wonderland Bakery	David of Spades (voice)	Recurring role
2022–2024	Teen Titans Go!	Folding Paper Man (voice)	6 episodes
2023	American Auto	Dale	5 episodes
2025	Georgie & Mandy's First Marriage	Donnie	Episode: "A Bus Bench and Faith out the Wazoo"

Web
Year	Title	Role	Notes
2010	Squatters	Hung	2 episodes
2011	Awkward Universe	Darren	Episode: "Wet Crotch Clarification"
2011	Aim High	Scotty Winelin	5 episodes
2015	Not So Union	Orbit	Episode: "Silverback"

Video games
Year	Title	Voice role	Notes
2009	G.I. Joe: The Rise of Cobra	Firefly	
2010	White Knight Chronicles	Raus	English version
2012	Skylanders: Giants	Shroomboom	
2013	Skylanders: Swap Force	Shroomboom	
2014	Skylanders: Trap Team	Additional voices	
2015	Skylanders: SuperChargers	Shroomboom	
2016	Skylanders: Imaginators	Shroomboom	
2023	Starfield	Nyx	
2024	Call of Duty: Black Ops 6	Additional voices	
