= Edgar Morais =

Portuguese actor and filmmaker

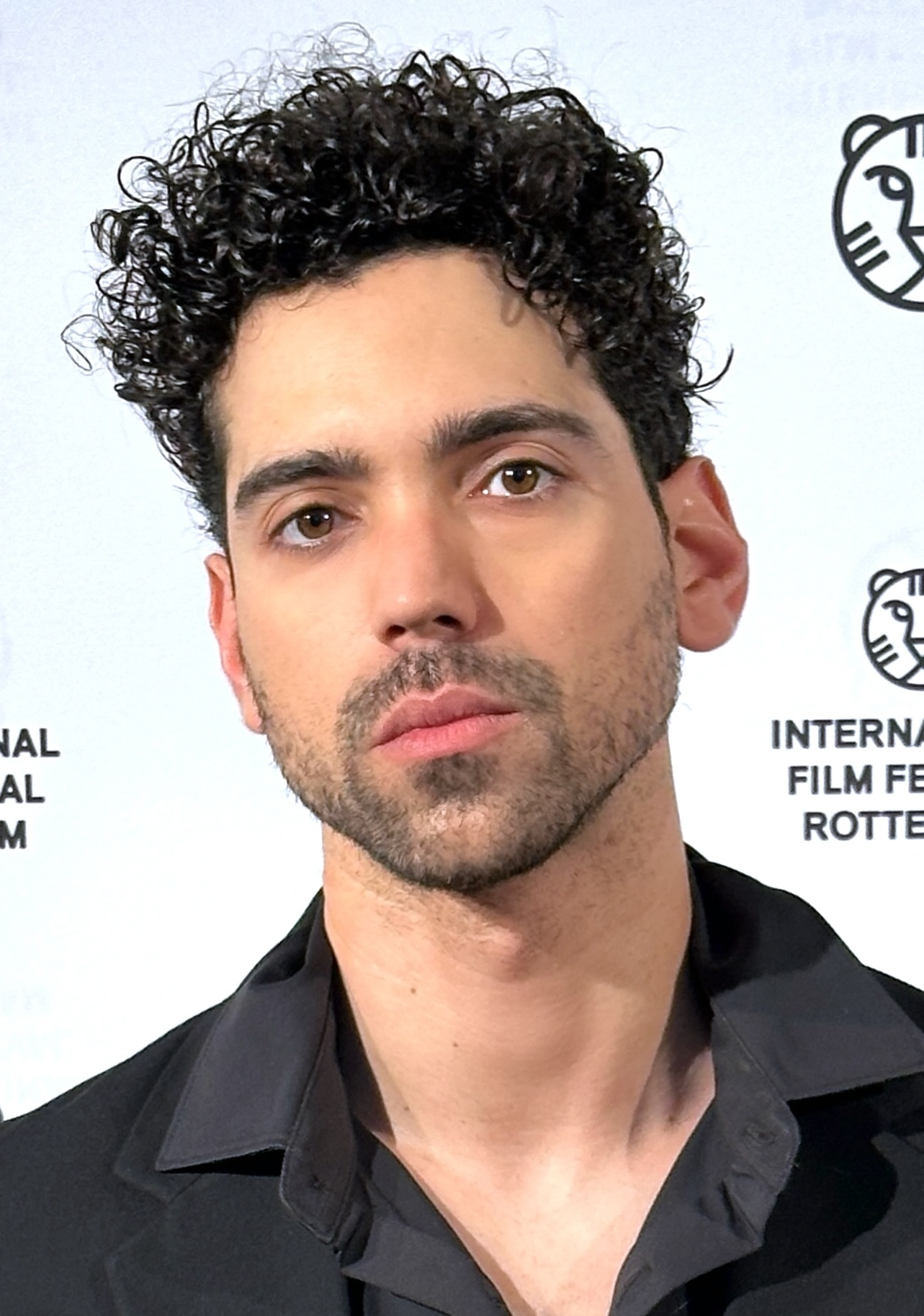
- Edgar Morais at International Film Festival Rotterdam
- Born: 25 June 1989 (age 37); Coimbra, Portugal
- Citizenship: Portugal; United States
- Occupations: Actor; film director; screenwriter; producer
- Years active: 2003–present

Edgar Miguel Diogo de Morais (born June 25, 1989) is a Portuguese actor, film director, screenwriter, and producer. Edgar won the Best Actor award at the Prishtina International Film Festival and was nominated for a Golden Globe (Portugal) for his performance in A Cup of Coffee and New Shoes On (2022), Albania's submission for the 95th Academy Awards. His performance received widespread international critical acclaim, including from Variety and Screen International. As a director, his works include Heatstroke (2019) and the award-winning We Won't Forget (2021).

== Early life ==
Morais was born in Portugal, to an antique restorer mother and a contractor father. He graduated in acting from Portugal's EPTC and was a student of Ivana Chubbuck in LA and Susan Batson in NYC.

== Film acting career ==
Morais made his film acting debut in From Now On (2007) directed by Catarina Ruivo. The film received the Audience Award at the Rio de Janeiro International Film Festival.

He subsequently appeared in the NBC series CTRL (2009), directed by Robert Kirbyson, as well as in Saudade (2010), the directional debut short film of Q'orianka Kilcher. His later credits include Chasing Eagle Rock (2011), directed by Erick Avari; The Monogamy Experiment (2012) (directed by Amy Rider), alongside Shailene Woodley; and Oh Gallow Lay (2015), directed by Julian Wayser, which premiered in the Horizons section of the 72nd Venice International Film Festival.

In 2019, Morais was invited to take part in the "Passaporte" initiative by the Portuguese Academy of Cinema (Academia Portuguesa de Cinema).

Morais later appeared in Marfa Girl 2 (2018), directed by Larry Clark; Restos do Vento (Remains of the Wind) (2022), directed by Tiago Guedes, selected at 2022 Cannes Film Festival; and Lovely, Dark, and Deep (2023), directed by Teresa Sutherland.

In 2023, Morais starred in A Cup of Coffee and New Shoes On, which premiered in competition at the Tallinn Black Nights Film Festival. The film was subsequently screened at several international festivals, including the Gothenburg Film Festival and the Thessaloniki International Film Festival, where it received the Fischer Audience Award. The film was selected as Albania's official submission for the Academy Award for Best International Feature Film.

In 2024, Morais portrayed British artist Simeon Solomon in The Worst Man in London, directed by Rodrigo Areias. The film was selected for the Big Screen Competition at the International Film Festival Rotterdam.

He is set to appear in Sara Driver's An Odd Enchantment, alongside Maria de Medeiros and Mathieu Amalric and in João Pedro Rodrigues's Afonso's Smile, produced by Luca Guadagnino.

== Directing career ==
After directing music videos for artists including Shiny Toy Guns and MOTHXR, Morais made his narrative directorial debut with the short film Heatstroke (2019). The film premiered in competition at the IndieLisboa International Film Festival and was subsequently screened at several international festivals, including PÖFF Shorts, the Maryland Film Festival, the Beverly Hills Film Festival, FEST New Directors New Films Festival, and Method Fest Independent Film Festival.

In 2021, Morais co-directed the award-winning short film We Won't Forget with Luke Eberl. Co-written by Morais, Eberl, and Whitney Able, the film premiered in competition at the Academy Award, BAFTA and Goya-qualifying Palm Springs ShortFest.. It was subsequently screened at various other international festivals including the Hamptons International Film Festival, Tirana International Film Festival, Woodstock Film Festival, Rooftop Films, Dresden, Rio and IndieLisboa International Film Festival. The film was selected as a Vimeo Staff Pick and Short of the Week.

Morais is directing his first feature film, You Above All, a Portuguese–American co-production co-directed with Luke Eberl, which is currently in post-production. He is also directing It Was Them, a multi-year documentary currently in production executive produced by Larry Clark.

== Accolades ==
Morais was nominated for Best Lead Actor at the 29th Golden Globes (Portugal) in 2025 for his portrayal of Gezim, in A Cup of Coffee and New Shoes On. For the same role, he also won the Best Actor Award at the Prishtina International Film Festival.. His performance received critical acclaim, with Variety (magazine) and Screen International identifying it among the year's standout performances.

As a director, Morais's short film Heatstroke (2019) won the "Best Screenplay" award at the CinEuphoria awards, where it was also recognized as one of the "Top Short Films of the Year". The film was later broadcast by RTP.

His subsequent short film, We Won't Forget (2021), received the Grand Jury Prize and Best Editing Award at the Castrovillari Film Festival, as well as the Jury Honorable Mention at FEST New Directors New Films Festival. The film was also nominated for Best Fiction Short Film at the 2022 Portuguese Academy Sophia Awards.

In 2024, Morais served on the jury for the Gold and Silver Lynx competitions at FEST New Directors New Films Festival alongside director Pilar Palomero. He also participated as a featured speaker at the festival, joining Kenneth Lonergan, Melissa Leo, and Nadine Labaki. Morais has also served on the juries of the Castrovillari Film Festival, Caminhos do Cinema Português, Cinalfama Lisbon Film Festival, and Prémios Curtas.

In June 2026, Morais was invited to become a member of the European Film Academy.

== Theater career ==
Morais made his stage debut in 2006, appearing in William Shakespeare's Macbeth at the Mirita Casimiro Theatre in Lisbon. He subsequently performed in productions including Molière's A Rehearsal at Versailles, Brian Friel's Lovers, Jean Genet's Deathwatch, Arnold Wesker's The Kitchen, and William Shakespeare's The Tragedy of Julius Caesar. The latter, directed by Luís Miguel Cintra at Teatro São Luiz, received the Portuguese Golden Globe for Best Theatre Production.

In 2024, Morais starred alongside Samuel Adewunmi in director Craig Viveiros's stage adaptation of Lulu Raczka's Nothing at ZDB Marvila in Lisbon.

== Photography ==
In March 2024, Morais presented his first photography exhibition, It Lasts Forever, at Casa do Comum in Lisbon. The exhibition featured photographs taken between 2012 and 2023.

A second presentation of It Lasts Forever was held at FEST New Directors New Films Festival in Espinho, Portugal, in June and July 2024. As part of the exhibition, Morais installed a public restroom inside an enclosed black-box space, inviting visitors to interact with it. The evolving condition of the installation formed part of the exhibition's exploration of the relationship between private and public space.

The exhibition received positive critical attention with Diário de Notícias describing it as “A notable exhibit. An experience about intimacy, and a wild breath of youth. A perspective that evokes and challenges the spirit of Nan Goldin as well as a naked exploration of California’s culture."

== Acting Filmography ==
Year	Title	Director/s	Notes
2007	From Now On	Catarina Ruivo	Winner of the Audience Award at Rio de Janeiro Film Festival
2008	Coach Shane	Drew Renaud	
2009	CTRL	Robert Kirbyson	
2010	Greece	Sarah Deakins	
2010	Saudade	Q'orianka Kilcher	
2010	Miss Nothing (music video)	Meiert Avis	Single - The Pretty Reckless
2011	Chasing Eagle Rock	Erick Avari	
2011	You Are The Blood	Rafael Morais	
2012	Joshua Tree, 1951: A Portrait of James Dean	Matthew Mishory	
2015	The Monogamy Experiment	Amy Rider	
2015	Oh Gallow Lay	Julian Wayser	Venice Film Festival Horizons section 2015
2018	Marfa Girl 2	Larry Clark	
2018	You See the Moon	Miguel Nunes	CPH:DOX (Next:Wave) 2019, IndieLisboa International Film Festival 2018 (in competition - Short Film Grand Prize) 2018
2019	Heatstroke	Edgar Morais	IndieLisboa International Film Festival 2019 (in competition - Short Film Grand Prize), FEST New Directors New Films Festival 2019 (in competition - Portuguese Grand Prix), Tallinn Black Nights Film Festival, Beverly Hills Film Festival, Method Fest Independent Film Festival. Nominated for 5 CinEuphoria Awards, winner for "Best Screenplay" and "Top Short Film of the Year"
2021	We Won't Forget	Edgar Morais, Luke Eberl	Palm Springs International ShortFest, Hamptons International Film Festival, Tirana International Film Festival, Woodstock Film Festival, IndieLisboa International Film Festival, Rooftop Films, Mammoth Lakes Film Festival, Shnit Worldwide, Bushwick Film Festival, Caminhos do Cinema Português, Castrovillari Film Festival (Grand Jury Prize winner, Best Editing winner), FEST New Directors New Films Festival (Jury's Honorable Mention), Sophia Awards (nominated, Best Short Film).
2022	Restos	Tiago Guedes	Cannes Film Festival Official Selection
2022	A Cup of Coffee and New Shoes On	Gentian Koçi	World premiere at Tallinn Black Nights Film Festival in Official Competition on November 21, 2022; Gothenburg Film Festival selection; Fischer Audience Award winner at 2023's Thessaloniki Film Festival; Best Actor Award winner (Edgar Morais) at 2023's Prishtina International Film Festival; Best Actor nominee at Portugal's Golden Globes.
2023	Lovely, Dark and Depp	Teresa Sutherland	World Premiere in competition at Fantasia Film Festival.
2024	The Worst Man In London	Rodrigo Areias	World premiere in the Big Screen Competition at International Film Festival Rotterdam.
2026	Super Past Car	João Salgado	
2026	Asphalt Guerrilla	Edgar Pêra	Fuori Concorso Locarno International Film Festival.
2027	You Above All	Edgar Morais, Luke Eberl	Post-Production
2027	An Odd Enchantment	Sara Driver	Filming
2027	Afonso's Smile	João Pedro Rodrigues	Filming
