= We Won't Forget =

2021 short film

- Directed by: Edgar Morais; Luke Eberl
- Written by: Edgar Morais; Luke Eberl; Whitney Able
- Produced by: Whitney Able; Edgar Morais; Luke Eberl
- Starring: Whitney Able
- Cinematography: Luke Eberl
- Edited by: Edgar Morais; Luke Eberl
- Production companies: Volpana; Welcome Home Love
- Release date: 25 June 2021
- Running time: 13 minutes
- Countries: USA; Portugal
- Language: English

We Won't Forget is a 2021 short film directed by Edgar Morais and Luke Eberl. The film premiered in competition on 25 June 2021, at the Palm Springs International Festival of Short Films and went on to screen at more than 25 film festivals worldwide.

== Synopsis ==
A woman's frustrations boil to the surface while hosting a party for her friends, culminating in a public freakout that turns into collective hysteria.

== Cast ==
- Whitney Able
- John Patrick Amedori
- Paul James
- Edgar Morais
- Johnny Wactor
- Sam Morgan
- J.J. Nolan
- Escher Holloway
- Tommy Snider
- Davida Williams
- Caitlyn Folley
- Zachary Kemper

== Film festivals ==
- Palm Springs ShortFest
- Hamptons International Film Festival
- Tirana International Film Festival
- Woodstock Film Festival
- Rooftop Films
- Mammoth Lakes Film Festival

== Awards and accolades ==
In 2022, the film was nominated for a Sophia Award (Portuguese Academy Award) for Best Fiction Short Film.

- Grand Jury Prize winner, Castrovillari Film Festival
- Best Editing winner, Castrovillari Film Festival
- Jury's Honorable Mention at FEST New Directors New Films Festival.

In 2023, the film was selected as a Vimeo Staff Pick and Short of the Week.
