= Lucas Elliot Eberl =

American actor and director

Luke Eberl
- Born: Lucas Elliot Eberl; March 29, 1986 (age 40); Boulder, Colorado, United States
- Occupations: Actor, writer, director
- Years active: 1997–present

Luke Eberl (born March 29, 1986) is an American actor, director, and pianist best known for his role as Birn in the 2001 film Planet of the Apes and for his film Choose Connor. In 2008, Eberl was described by MovieMaker Magazine as one of the "10 Young Americans to Watch". He is currently in production on his second feature film, You Above All.

== Directing career ==
Eberl began his filmmaking career in 1997 after his first film acting job at the age of 10, making documentaries for the local TV station winning a variety of awards. He then wrote and directed Incest which won the Audience Choice Award at the international First Look Student Film Festival, and stars Erick Avari, Hallee Hirsh, and John Patrick Amedori. Eberl subsequently directed several short films which played at film festivals all over the world.

In 2008, his directorial feature film debut, the political drama Choose Connor, starring Steven Weber, Alex Linz, Escher Holloway, John Rubinstein, April Grace, and Richard Riehle, toured to film festivals worldwide including CineVegas, Woodstock Film Festival, Rome International Film Festival, Method Fest, Newport Beach Film Festival, Omaha Film Festival, Seattle International Film Festival, NewFilmmakers NY and LA, as well as the Philadelphia International Film Festival, where Choose Connor won the Jury Prize for Best American Independent. It was then released theatrically and on DVD by Strand Releasing to rave reviews from major publications including The New York Times, Los Angeles Times, Washington Post, and Variety.

Eberl was named by MovieMaker Magazine one of the "10 Young Americans to Watch".

In 2011, Eberl co-directed with Tommy Snider the "Together Again" music video for the Grammy nominated band Shiny Toy Guns, and co-directed with Edgar Morais the music videos for Shiny Toy Guns' subsequent singles "Waiting Alone" and "Fading Listening", as well as the music video for "Centerfold" by MOTHXR.

Eberl filmed Fault Line, a feature film set in Los Angeles, in secret with a cast that includes Kris Lemche, Caitlyn Folley, Dov Tiefenbach, Jon Foster, Michael Welch, Edgar Morais, Chris Marquette, Zoë Kravitz, Leah Pipes, Lou Taylor Pucci and Angela Sarafyan. The film is described as being a period piece taking place in 2009 that revolves around the lives of a group of young adults struggling with the consequences of a rapidly changing world during the turn of the decade. The film is expected to be released in 2026.

On June 25, 2021, We Won't Forget, the short film directed by Lucas Elliot Eberl and Edgar Morais, had its world premiere in competition at the Academy Awards qualifying Palm Springs International ShortFest. The film was co-written by the directors and Whitney Able, who stars in the film as a woman whose frustrations boil to the surface while hosting a party for her friends, culminating in a public freakout that turns into collective hysteria. Edgar Morais also stars in the film alongside John Patrick Amedori, Paul James, Davida Williams and Caitlyn Folley, among others. The film screened in competition at the Hamptons International Film Festival, Tirana International Film Festival, Woodstock Film Festival, Rooftop Films and IndieLisboa International Film Festival, among many others and was selected as a Vimeo Staff Pick and Short of the Week.

We Won't Forget won the Grand Jury Prize, as well as the award for Best Editing at Castrovillari Film Festival and the Jury's Honorable Mention at FEST New Directors New Films Festival. and was nominated for Best Fiction Short Film at the 2022 Sophia Awards (Portuguese Academy Award).

Eberl is currently in production on the multi-year spanning feature film You Above All, co-directing with Edgar Morais.

== Acting career ==
Eberl started his acting career in the Colorado theater, performing on many stages including at the Denver Center Theater Company, Denver Civic Theater, Arvada Center for the Arts and Humanities, Boulder's Dinner Theatre, and several others.

Eberl's long list of film acting credits include a lead role in Tim Burton's Planet of the Apes, with Mark Wahlberg, Tim Roth, Helena Bonham Carter; Phantoms, with Ben Affleck and Peter O'Toole; and Lost In the Pershing Point Hotel, with John Ritter; A Painted House based on John Grisham's novel, with Logan Lerman, Scott Glenn, Robert Sean Leonard, and Melinda Dillon, directed by Alfonso Arau; and in Clint Eastwood's Letters from Iwo Jima with Ken Watanabe; Larry Clark's Marfa Girl 2; Miguel Nunes' You See the Moon, Final Recourse with Chaz Palminteri and Teri Polo, the cult teen comedy Getting that Girl, and Marcela Jacobina's Nobody with Carloto Cotta.

Luke Eberl portrayed the poet, playwright, novelist and critic Algernon Charles Swinburne in 2024's The Worst Man In London directed by Rodrigo Areias and produced by Paulo Branco which screened as an official selection in the Big Screen Competition at 2024 International Film Festival Rotterdam with a cast that also includes Albano Jerónimo, Edgar Morais, Edward Ashley, Simon Paisley Day, Scott Coffey and Carmen Chaplin.

He won the award for Best Actor in a Short Film at the prestigious Method Fest for his performance in Aaron Himelstein's Sugar Mountain. Luke has also had guest starring roles on many television series including Cold Case, Judging Amy, Boston Public, Touched by an Angel, ER, and Big Love as well as a recurring role as Daniel Gibson on the Netflix series Daredevil and voicing several characters on the Disney Channel series Fillmore!

Eberl's upcoming projects include Victoria Mahoney's Chalk and the RTP series Lugar 54.

== Music career ==
Luke Eberl is also an accomplished pianist and composer. He is the piano protégé of Frank Zappa's legendary Grammy-nominated pianist Tommy Mars. He has performed live all over the world and recorded with several bands.

For Scholastic Books he composed and performed the score for the promotional materials and book tour of Caldecott Medal-winning Brian Selznick's book "The Marvels", the audio book for Martha Brockenbrough's "Into the Bloodred Woods", and composed and performed the score for the short film companions to Scholastic's "You Are (Not) Small" and Mo Willems' "That is NOT a Good Idea" which was awarded the prestigious Andrew Carnegie Medal for Excellence in Children's Video. He composed the theme music for the Scholastic Reads Podcast and has music featured on Adam Schartoff's "Filmwax Radio" Podcast and the news program "Democracy Now".

He has been the composer for films such as "The Maestro" starring Xander Berkeley, "The Napkin” starring Scoot McNairy and "Twenty-Three Pints" starring Alexandra Krosney. He has performed in Los Angeles such as the House of Blues, Hotel Cafe, The Mint, Harvard and Stone, Don't Tell Mama, Witzend, Rockwell, Trip, and many others, and in New York City venues including Symphony Space, The Hudson Theatre, Caffe Vivaldi, Gussy's, The Path Cafe, DBA, and others. He has also performed in Colorado at venues including Trident Cafe, Johnny's Cigar Bar, Southern Sun, The Laughing Goat, Mountain Sun, and Bramble and Hare, and in Lisbon, Portugal at Cossoul, O Grilo Beato, Clube B.Leza, O Limbo, Les Bons Vivants, Piano Aquário, and in Porto, Portugal at Menina e Moça.

His debut solo piano album was set for release in 2024.

== Work in Canadian arctic ==
Eberl lived for one year in Canada's arctic where he worked with schoolchildren in the town of Inuvik, Northwest Territories teaching piano and film. On occasion he taught a video production class at Samuel Hearne Secondary School and even coached two students to the Territorial Skills Competition held in Yellowknife, Northwest Territories. He added to the popularity of filmmaking in the north and encouraged the youth to continue to produce short films.

== Acting filmography ==
Year	Title	Role	Other notes
1998	Phantoms	Tunnel Boy	as Luke Eberl
2000	Lost in the Pershing Point Hotel	Young Storyteller	as Luke Eberl
2001	Planet of the Apes	Birn	as Luke Eberl
	Touched by an Angel	Young Daniel	
2003	Fillmore!	Oscar Mabini / Cuzzy Shotwell / Jeeter / Henchman	
	Searching for Haizmann	Julian Cain	
2004	Boston Public	Dominick Avery	
	Judging Amy	Terry Shein	
	Cold Case	Wayne Larkin	
2005	Landslide	Steven Decker	
	Sugar Mountain	Jude	winner, Best Actor, The Method Fest
2006	Letters from Iwo Jima	Sam	as Lucas Elliott
	Big Love	Detweiler	
2009	Surprise, Surprise	David Brand	as Lucas Elliott
2009	Numbers	James	
2009	Adam	Adam	
2009	Eyeborgs	Jarett Hewes	as Luke Eberl
2010	Here & Now	Young David	
2011	Getting That Girl	Ferrat Barret	as Luke Eberl
2012	Ashley	Randall	
2013	Final Recourse	Will	as Luke Eberl
2014	Menthol	Roth	
2015	Masterless	Derek	
	The Slap		
	Oh, Gallow Lay		
2016	Daredevil	Daniel Gibson	
2018	You See the Moon	Luke	
2018	Marfa Girl 2	Luke	
2018	The Maestro	Adam	
2018	Shadow of a Gun	Richard	
2023	Nobody	@__filthyrich__	
2024	The Worst Man In London	Algernon Charles Swinburne	

== Directing filmography ==
Year	Title	Other notes
2002	Incest	
2009	Fault Line	
2005	Fellowship	
2007	Choose Connor	Winner of the American Independents Award at Philadelphia Film Festival
2007	Everything You Don't Know I Don't Know	
2011	11:30 PM	
2021	We Won't Forget	Co-directed with Edgar Morais
2025	You Above All	Co-directing with Edgar Morais
