= 2 Broke Girls season 6 =

Season of television series

2 Broke Girls
- Season 6
- DVD cover
- Starring: Kat Dennings; Beth Behrs; Garrett Morris; Jonathan Kite; Matthew Moy; Jennifer Coolidge
- No. of episodes: 22

Release
- Original network: CBS
- Original release: October 10, 2016 – April 17, 2017

Season chronology
- ← Previous; Season 5

The sixth and final season of the American television sitcom 2 Broke Girls premiered on CBS on October 10, 2016, and concluded on April 17, 2017. The series was created and executively produced by Michael Patrick King and Whitney Cummings. The season focuses on Max Black, a sarcastic below-the-poverty-line waitress, and Caroline Channing, a disgraced New York socialite turned waitress, as they continue their cupcake business venture.

Kat Dennings and Beth Behrs portray the two lead characters of the series, Max Black and Caroline Channing. The main cast is rounded out by actors Garrett Morris, Jonathan Kite, Matthew Moy, and Jennifer Coolidge, who portray Earl, Oleg, Han Lee, and Sophie Kaczynski, respectively.

This was the second time that a season premiered in October instead of September, and the first time the season ended in April instead of May. On May 12, 2017, it was announced the series was canceled after six seasons. The season finale, titled "And 2 Broke Girls: The Movie", serves as the de facto series finale.

== Plot ==
The final season follows Max Black (Kat Dennings) and Caroline Channing (Beth Behrs) as they work to expand their business venture, Max's Homemade Cupcakes, with their personal lives and relationships becoming more and more complicated. Following the end of season five, Max and Caroline are now part-owners of the Brooklyn diner, along with Han. Sophie and Oleg navigate the challenges of becoming new parents as their differences and similarities shape their growing family.

== Cast and characters ==
- Kat Dennings as Max Black
- Beth Behrs as Caroline Channing
- Jonathan Kite as Oleg
- Garrett Morris as Earl
- Matthew Moy as Han
- Jennifer Coolidge as Sophie Kaczynsky

== Episodes ==
No. overall	No. in season	Title	Directed by	Written by	Original release date	Prod. code	U.S. viewers (millions)
117	1	"And the Two Openings: Parts 1 & 2"	Fred Savage	Michelle Nader	October 10, 2016	T26.11151	6.36
118	2	"And the Two Openings: Parts 1 & 2"	Fred Savage	Liz Astrof	October 10, 2016	T26.11152	6.36
In the first half hour, the girls try to balance working at the diner, in which they now own a majority share, and opening their dessert bar. In the second half hour, Sophie delivers her baby daughter, Barbara. During both episodes, Max is continually sexting and video-chatting with Randy, who has moved back to California. Final tally for cupcake business venture: $535
119	3	"And the 80's Movie"	Fred Savage	Patrick Walsh	October 17, 2016	T26.11153	5.66
The girls go out of their way to get a hip, wealthy crowd to patronize their dessert bar, but only succeed in attracting a group of tough women who are into arm wrestling. Meanwhile, Oleg and Sophie are frustrated that Sophie cannot have sex for 30 days after delivering her baby. Final tally for cupcake business venture: $1,050
120	4	"And the Godmama Drama"	Kathleen Marshall	Michael Lisbe & Nate Reger	October 24, 2016	T26.11154	5.60
Oleg's mother Olga (Mercedes Ruehl) arrives from Ukraine for Barbara's Christening, and quickly disapproves of Max and Caroline being the godparents. Remembering that Earl is an ordained minister, Oleg, Sophie and the girls arrange to have a secret baptism performed in the dessert bar. Final tally for cupcake business venture: $1,845.25
121	5	"And the College Experience"	Kathleen Marshall	Brian Rubenstein	October 31, 2016	T26.11155	4.99
After a local trade magazine reviews the dessert bar, Caroline is invited to speak to a business class at Wharton, her alma mater. She brings along Max, who is determined to give Caroline the full college experience she missed out on as a student. Meanwhile, Sophie will not ever let Barbara out of her sight, causing Oleg to take drastic measures to ensure he gets time for bonding with his daughter. Final tally for cupcake business venture: $2,710.15
122	6	"And the Rom-Commie"	Lonny Price	Justin Sayre	November 7, 2016	T26.11156	5.42
When Randy tells Max he has an upcoming hour layover in Newark, Caroline insists that Max go there to meet him. Max is otherwise occupied making a special-order cake for a dessert bar customer, and Han later accidentally destroys the cake. Meanwhile, an old flame of Earl's from 1961 returns from Cuba and looks him up. Final tally for cupcake business venture: $3,710.65
123	7	"And the Sophie Doll"	Don Scardino	Michael Glouberman	November 14, 2016	T26.11157	5.18
When the girls take a bartending class in order to expand the cocktail menu at their dessert bar, Caroline must think quickly when she has to take the class exam solo after Max gets chicken pox from Han. Also, Sophie creates a creepy lookalike video monitor doll to keep tabs on baby Barbara. Final tally for cupcake business venture: $3,340.35
124	8	"And the Duck Stamp"	Don Scardino	Charles Brottmiller	November 21, 2016	T26.11158	5.37
The girls hire a bartender who has a "following", leading to a very successful night at the dessert bar. His specialty drink contains cacao, to which Han becomes addicted while working to create a duck stamp for a U.S. Postal Service contest. Meanwhile, Sophie finds she has no time to do her hair and makeup with Barbara taking all her attention. Final tally for cupcake business venture: $4,840.35
125	9	"And the About FaceTime"	Steve Zuckerman	Rachel Palmer & David Shecter	December 5, 2016	T26.11159	5.68
Max and Randy arrange a "double date" with Caroline and Randy's young New York associate, Tyler, though Randy is only available via computer screen on FaceTime. Caroline, who has not had sex in two years, tries everything she can to be alone with Tyler, but Max's breakup with Randy gets in the way. Meanwhile, Oleg is upset when Sophie insists he sell his beloved Toyota Yaris so they can buy a minivan. Final tally for cupcake business venture: $5,821.62
126	10	"And the Himmicane"	Steve Zuckerman	Brian Rubenstein	December 12, 2016	T26.11160	5.81
As the dessert bar prepares to host a large event, a hurricane hits Brooklyn, causing a power blackout. Max ponders whether her recent breakup from Randy is real, while Oleg worries because Sophie is at home alone with Barbara's handsome "manny". Final tally for cupcake business venture: $5,521.62
127	11	"And the Planes, Fingers and Automobiles"	Anthony Rich	Patrick Walsh	December 19, 2016	T26.11161	5.02
Max wants to get back with Randy, and decides to travel to LA along with Caroline and Han. Han's car breaks down on-route, so they hitch a ride with a trucker called Becky who tells them about her friend "Sloppy Joe" who owns a plane that could get them to LA. The girls decide to travel on the plane, and Max continues to obsess over Randy. Max discovers that Randy is currently shooting a movie in Austin, Texas. Oleg and Sophie are left behind to run the diner while the group is away. Final tally for cupcake business venture: $3,521.62
128	12	"And the Riverboat Runs Through It"	Jason Ensler	Michelle Nader	January 2, 2017	T26.11162	5.88
After being dropped off (quite literally) in the middle of nowhere by Sloppy Joe, the girls find their purses and all their money are missing. They stow away on a riverboat casino bound for New Orleans, and have to work as waitresses after being caught. Back home, Sophie and Oleg are taking care of Chestnut when they stumble upon a way to make money off of the horse. Final tally for cupcake business venture: $500
129	13	"And the Stalking Dead"	John Riggi	Michael Lisbe & Nate Reger	January 16, 2017	T26.11163	6.40
Max and Caroline make it to Austin to see Randy on the movie set, where they are recruited to play extras in a zombie film. Meanwhile, Oleg tries to make repairs in the dessert bar, while lamenting that Barbara keeps calling him "mama". Final tally for cupcake business venture: $484
130	14	"And the Emergency Contractor"	John Riggi	Liz Astrof	January 23, 2017	T26.11164	7.06
Upon returning home, Caroline loves the renovations in the dessert bar, and soon falls for Bobby (Christopher Gorham), the contractor Oleg hired. Before Caroline can act, Max gets a call that Randy had an accident in Manhattan and is in the hospital. Max and Randy get closure on their relationship, as Randy says he cannot leave his business behind in L.A., while Max says she now has people in her life that are important to her. Meanwhile, Sophie joins a mothers group, but learns they all leave their babies with someone else and prefer to just party. Final tally for cupcake business venture: $2,372
131	15	"And the Turtle Sense"	Don Scardino	Michael Glouberman	February 6, 2017	T26.11165	5.98
Caroline is reluctant to go on a "night date" with Bobby, because it means leaving Max to run the dessert bar alone. Throughout the date, Caroline constantly interrupts their time together to check in on Max, but it turns out Max is handling things fine, albeit differently than Caroline would. Final tally for cupcake business venture: $3,145
132	16	"And the Tease Time"	Don Scardino	Justin Sayre	February 13, 2017	T26.11166	6.00
Caroline goes all out to prepare for the crucial third date with Bobby, including buying some sexy underwear and taking burlesque lessons. Meanwhile, Max proclaims that she is done with sex and does one of the least sexy things possible – going golfing with Han. Final tally for cupcake business venture: $4,895
133	17	"And the Jessica Shmessica"	Don Scardino	Charles Brottmiller	February 20, 2017	T26.11167	5.81
Caroline visits Bobby's home to meet his mother (Nora Dunn), who is still hung up on Jessica, the woman to whom Bobby was "engaged to be engaged" over a year ago. Complicating things, the entire diner crew invite themselves to the party. Final tally for cupcake business venture: $5,672.72
134	18	"And the Dad Day Afternoon"	John Riggi	Julie Mandel-Folly	February 27, 2017	T26.11168	5.74
Han's therapist convinces him to close the diner on a Sunday for some "me" time, and Han later informs Max that he thinks he has located her father and set up a rendezvous in a Rhode Island diner. The diner crew takes a road trip in Oleg and Sophie's minivan, but Max's father does not show. Final tally for cupcake business venture: $6,475.54
135	19	"And the Baby and Other Things"	Chris Poulos	Story by : Michael Lisbe & Nate Reger & Justin Sayre; Teleplay by : Brian Rubenstein	March 13, 2017	T26.11169	5.45
Max sees a text on Bobby's phone that makes her suspect Jessica is having Bobby's baby. Trying to confirm it, she and Han pretend to be an engaged couple and visit Jessica's wedding planning business. Meanwhile, Caroline gets on the bad side of Bobby's mom (again) when she unknowingly convinces Bobby's sister Denise to quit working for their mom. Final tally for cupcake business venture: $6,922.14
136	20	"And the Alley-Oops"	Jude Weng	Story by : Charles Brottmiller; Teleplay by : Patrick Walsh & Michael Glouberman	March 20, 2017	T26.11170	4.66
Bobby reveals to Caroline that he has a passion for bowling, and invites her along to watch his team, the Alley Oops, play for a championship. Caroline later accidentally slams a door on the hand of the team's best bowler, forcing Max to bowl as a substitute. Meanwhile, Oleg and Sophie are determined to win Barbara a stuffed animal from a claw machine. Final tally for cupcake business venture: $7,836.72
137	21	"And the Rock Me on the Dais"	Michelle Nader	Liz Astrof	April 10, 2017	T26.11171	4.64
Caroline and Max are invited to an exclusive sneak preview of the movie made about Caroline's life. Having rewritten the film's ending so that Caroline winds up with Candy Andy, the producers invite him to the screening; Bobby becomes jealous, though he refuses to admit it to Caroline. Meanwhile, Earl and Sophie learn that their characters were combined into one person. Final tally for cupcake business venture: $9,999.12
138	22	"And 2 Broke Girls: The Movie"	Kathleen Marshall	Michelle Nader	April 17, 2017	T26.11172	4.57
As the girls prepare for the premiere of The Princess and The Ponzi, they ask Han for a week's leave to get properly dressed and they call in a top fashion designer. At the premiere, Caroline has a mishap with a $10,000 "on loan" dress, while Randy shows up unannounced. Max flees to the dessert bar, but Randy follows and says he is moving to New York permanently. He proposes to Max, and Caroline soon arrives to see the ring on Max's finger. It's then revealed that Bobby and Randy know each other and are enemies, due to Randy's firm rejecting Bobby's mother and sister for a reality show. As Max and Caroline are excited for the future, their men start to fight. Final tally for cupcake business venture: $0.00

== Ratings ==
Viewership and ratings per episode of 2 Broke Girls season 6
No.	Title	Air date	Rating/share (18–49)	Viewers (millions)
1–2	"And the Two Openings"	October 10, 2016	1.7/5	6.36
3	"And the 80's Movie"	October 17, 2016	1.5/5	5.66
4	"And the Godmama Drama"	October 24, 2016	1.4/5	5.60
5	"And the College Experience"	October 31, 2016	1.3/5	4.99
6	"And the Rom-Commie"	November 7, 2016	1.4/4	5.42
7	"And the Sophie Doll"	November 14, 2016	1.3/4	5.18
8	"And the Duck Stamp"	November 21, 2016	1.4/5	5.37
9	"And the About FaceTime"	December 5, 2016	1.3/4	5.68
10	"And the Himmicane"	December 12, 2016	1.2/4	5.81
11	"And the Planes, Fingers and Automobiles"	December 19, 2016	1.2/4	5.02
12	"And the Riverboat Runs Through It"	January 2, 2017	1.3/4	5.88
13	"And the Stalking Dead"	January 16, 2017	1.5/5	6.40
14	"And the Emergency Contractor"	January 23, 2017	1.7/6	7.06
15	"And the Turtle Sense"	February 6, 2017	1.3/5	5.98
16	"And the Tease Time"	February 13, 2017	1.2/4	6.00
17	"And the Jessica Shmessica"	February 20, 2017	1.2/4	5.81
18	"And the Dad Day Afternoon"	February 27, 2017	1.2/4	5.74
19	"And the Baby and Other Things"	March 13, 2017	1.1/4	5.45
20	"And the Alley-Oops"	March 20, 2017	1.0/4	4.66
21	"And the Rock Me on the Dais"	April 10, 2017	1.0/4	4.64
22	"And 2 Broke Girls: The Movie"	April 17, 2017	1.0/4	4.57
