= 2 Broke Girls season 5 =

Season of television series

2 Broke Girls
- Season 5
- DVD cover
- Starring: Kat Dennings; Beth Behrs; Garrett Morris; Jonathan Kite; Matthew Moy; Jennifer Coolidge
- No. of episodes: 22

Release
- Original network: CBS
- Original release: November 12, 2015 – May 12, 2016

Season chronology
- ← Previous; Season 4 Next → Season 6

The fifth season of the American television sitcom 2 Broke Girls premiered on CBS on November 12, 2015, and concluded on May 12, 2016. The series was created and executively produced by Michael Patrick King and Whitney Cummings. The season focuses on Max Black, a sarcastic below-the-poverty-line waitress, and Caroline Channing, a disgraced New York socialite turned waitress, as they continue their cupcake business venture.

Kat Dennings and Beth Behrs portray the two lead characters of the series, Max Black and Caroline Channing. The main cast is rounded out by actors Garrett Morris, Jonathan Kite, Matthew Moy, and Jennifer Coolidge, who portray Earl, Oleg, Han Lee, and Sophie Kaczynski, respectively.

== Plot ==
As Max Black (Kat Dennings) and Caroline Channing (Beth Behrs) continue moving forward with Max's Homemade Cupcakes, their relationships become more complicated, and new opportunities are presented when a producer is interested in Caroline's rights to her life story to turn into a movie. Meanwhile, Sophie and Oleg start thinking about their future when Sophie realizes she might be pregnant.

== Cast and characters ==
- Kat Dennings as Max Black
- Beth Behrs as Caroline Channing
- Jonathan Kite as Oleg
- Garrett Morris as Earl
- Matthew Moy as Han
- Jennifer Coolidge as Sophie Kaczynsky

== Episodes ==
No. overall	No. in season	Title	Directed by	Written by	Original release date	Prod. code	U.S. viewers (millions)
95	1	"And the Wrecking Ball"	Michael Patrick King	Michael Patrick King	November 12, 2015	3J5051	6.34
A developer plans to demolish the diner, Max's Homemade Cupcakes, and all the other businesses on the block to make way for an IMAX theater, leading to a very brief Caroline-Han friendship and a search for historical evidence to foil the demolition project. Meanwhile, believing she is an expectant mother, Sophie takes many pregnancy tests. Final tally for cupcake business venture: $164
96	2	"And the Gym and Juice"	Michael Patrick King	Liz Astrof	November 19, 2015	3J5052	6.42
Han lets Max and Caroline use his one-day guest passes at his health club, where two housewives get angry at Caroline for stealing the attention of Brian, the hot yoga instructor. Max learns the gym's juice bar needs help, so she and Caroline get jobs there to retain their club privileges. Sophie vows to eat only healthy food while trying to conceive but, like the girls' jobs at the juice bar, it does not last long. Final tally for cupcake business venture: $264
97	3	"And the Maybe Baby"	Jason Reilly	Michelle Nader	November 26, 2015	3J5053	5.93
Caroline finds herself on an emotional rollercoaster when she encounters her old boyfriend 'Candy' Andy—going from denying her lingering feelings for him, to learning he's getting married, to somehow agreeing to make his wedding cake. Max finds most of this hilarious, but even she is both moved and shocked by the two later revelations. Elsewhere, Sophie has decided to use a life-like robot baby to prepare for her inevitable pregnancy. Final tally for cupcake business venture: $215
98	4	"And the Inside Outside Situation"	David Trainer	Justin Sayre	December 10, 2015	3J5054	5.70
When Caroline and Max are putting together an order for an LGBT client named "I", a misunderstanding involving the packaging for the cupcakes and the out-of-context comment "we cannot sell these cupcakes to you" triggers a community boycott against the allegedly bigoted cupcake shop. This also begins to ruin the diner's business, and Han's attempt to help does not work once the protesters realize he is straight. A friendly guy places a huge cupcake order for his organization and invites Caroline and Max to come to a convention, only for the girls to realize that the meeting is for an anti-gay "family values" group. They then figure out a way to let everyone know what they really stand for. Final tally for cupcake business venture: $110
99	5	"And the Escape Room"	David Trainer	Patrick Walsh	December 17, 2015	3J5055	6.92
Caroline learns that Max has been overcharging her $25 on her share of the rent every month. Max barely apologizes and gets mad when Caroline does not drop the matter. Caroline then refuses to help with the clues on a Han-mandated group outing to an escape room, until Max shows she really is sorry and they patch things up. Meanwhile, Oleg and Sophie's plans to conceive a child gross everyone out. Guest starring John Milhiser. Final tally for cupcake business venture: $174.35
100	6	"And the Not Regular Down There"	Katy Garretson	Rachel Sweet	January 6, 2016	3J5057	6.29
Max meets a handsome man named Owen and takes him home, but to her shock, he refuses to have sex with her. Owen says he wants to get to know Max first, and also reveals an interesting feature of his male anatomy. Sophie insists Oleg get his sperm count tested, then walks out on her own gynecologist appointment, afraid to learn she might actually be the reason they can't conceive. Guest starring Steve Talley as Owen. Final tally for cupcake business venture: $140
101	7	"And the Coming Out Party"	Michael Patrick King	Liz Feldman	January 13, 2016	3J5056	6.52
Caroline's Grandma Astrid (Judith Roberts) awakes from a five-year coma. Astrid's butler says she does not know about Caroline's father going to prison, nor is she aware that her own fortune was lost in the scandal. Things get complicated when Caroline learns Astrid expects a lavish "coming out" party. Elsewhere, Oleg seeks fertility drugs for Sophie, and Han tries to come up with a WiFi password that Max can't figure out. Final tally for cupcake business venture: $197
102	8	"And the Basketball Jones"	Katy Garretson	Morgan Murphy	January 20, 2016	3J5058	6.64
Oleg's cousin, who plays basketball for the Brooklyn Nets, has two tickets to an upcoming game which he gives to Oleg and Max. When Oleg backs out, Caroline takes his place. Because the game time conflicts with a local food festival at which Caroline hoped to distribute flyers for the cupcake business, she sneaks in a flyer to post at the Nets' arena, over Max's objections. Final tally for cupcake business venture: $280
103	9	"And the Sax Problem"	John Riggi	Charles Brottmiller	January 27, 2016	3J5059	6.63
Earl's old jazz ensemble, The Early Birds, is having a reunion concert at Ruby's, but Earl is not invited. The girls confront the club's owner, Ruby (Jackée Harry), who is also a former flame of Earl's, and learn that she is the one who refuses to invite him. After some convincing, Ruby finally relents and lets Earl play his sax with the group, but there's another problem: Earl, who has been off hard drugs for 30 years, claims he has never played while sober. Final tally for cupcake business venture: $80
104	10	"And the No New Friends"	Anthony Rich	Rob Sheridan	February 3, 2016	3J5060	6.34
When Max's old friend Becky White (Diona Reasonover) stops by the cupcake window, Caroline realizes she has not made any new friends other than Max since coming to Williamsburg. Caroline immediately befriends two young women sitting in the diner, and is invited to their weekend event. Max goes there with Caroline and jokes that the women might be in a cult, which turns out to be prophetic. Max and Caroline leave and are taken home by Oleg and Sophie. Final tally for cupcake business venture: $80
105	11	"And the Booth Babes"	Joel Murray	Rachel Lind & David Shecter	February 10, 2016	3J5061	6.36
When Max and Caroline work a promotional booth at a gaming convention that Han is attending, they discover that an avatar for a new game has been made in Max's image. Meanwhile, Oleg's cousin is remodeling Sophie's apartment, forcing her and Oleg to temporarily move into the girls' apartment, where they make themselves at home. Final tally for cupcake business venture: $380
106	12	"And the Story Telling Show"	Tom Stern	Morgan Murphy	February 18, 2016	3J5062	6.40
At the diner, Caroline meets a handsome man who asks her out, but his idea of a date is bringing her to watch him perform at a storytelling show. Though put off by the event, Caroline is encouraged by the MC to return to the club to tell her story. A representative from Warner Brothers hears Caroline's real-life tale and thinks it will make a good movie. She arranges a first class flight for Caroline to travel to Hollywood, which Caroline exchanges for two coach seats so Max can go too. Meanwhile, Sophie and Oleg search for a surrogate to carry their baby. Final tally for cupcake business venture: $390
107	13	"And the Lost Baggage"	James Burrows	Michael Patrick King	February 25, 2016	3J5063	6.56
Max and Caroline arrive in Hollywood, though Max's luggage does not. While Caroline waits for a chance to talk to producer Perry Tyler (Chris Williams), Max is upset that Randy (Ed Quinn), the lawyer she met at the hotel bar and later slept with, has not called or texted. Sophie arrives in town, seeking doctors who have performed fertility treatments for over-40 celebrities. Final tally for cupcake business venture: $390
108	14	"And You Bet Your Ass"	James Burrows	Liz Astrof & Michelle Nader	March 3, 2016	3J5064	6.74
Caroline gets her meeting with the head writer for the movie, who tells her that they do not want a "Max" character in the film at all. Caroline is upset until the writer says they are thinking of Jennifer Lawrence for her role. Max goes on a date with Randy, who tries to set up Caroline with his elderly friend Bob (George Hamilton), and later Max and Sophie go to an audition for The Price Is Right. In the end, Caroline tells Max she refused to agree to the film unless the Max role stays in. Final tally for cupcake business venture: $390
109	15	"And the Great Escape"	John Riggi	Liz Feldman	March 10, 2016	3J5065	6.54
While Caroline awaits a meeting with Jennifer Lawrence, who is interested in playing her role in the movie, Max offers to stay at Randy's house and watch his dog while he travels to Miami. But the dog runs away, putting the girls in the path of a serial killer. Convinced that bad karma is preventing her from becoming pregnant, Sophie tries in vain to stop insulting Caroline. Final tally for cupcake business venture: $390
110	16	"And the Pity Party Bus"	Don Scardino	Rachel Sweet	March 31, 2016	3J5066	5.69
The deal for the movie on Caroline's life story is a go, though she will not see a check for a month. As the girls prepare to head home, Randy meets with Max and breaks up with her through his therapist (John Michael Higgins). As the girls take a party bus to the airport, Caroline insists they stop at Randy's house to get closure. Randy tells Max he likes her too much, and knows how long-distance relationships usually end. Meanwhile, Sophie's spiritual healer says she cannot help her get pregnant because Sophie already is pregnant. Final tally for cupcake business venture: $90
111	17	"And the Show and Don't Tell"	Don Scardino	Patrick Walsh	April 7, 2016	3J5067	5.87
Caroline and Max decide to expand their cupcake business with the $250,000 that Caroline will receive for the movie about her life. They visit Caroline's father in prison to see a musical that he has written, where he tells Max that Caroline will not be happy and this is her big chance to move back to Manhattan, infuriating Max. Meanwhile, Sophie receives a letter identifying the sex of her baby but wants it to be revealed using a "gender reveal cake". Final tally for cupcake business venture: $72
112	18	"And the Loophole"	Don Scardino	Justin Sayre	April 14, 2016	3J5068	6.25
Caroline has received her money and she and Max search for a place to set up the dessert shop after Han refuses to allow them to expand in the diner. Randy shows up in town and Caroline urges Max to resist him, given the way Randy handled things in California, but Max cannot. In the end, Han relents and allows the girls to use their old cupcake space for their dessert shop. Final tally for cupcake business venture: $250,072
113	19	"And the Attack of the Killer Apartment"	Kathleen Marshall	Charles Brottmiller	April 21, 2016	3J5069	6.93
Randy decides he wants to spend a night in the girls' apartment to see how Max lives, but he soon steps on a floorboard nail and has to go to the hospital. He later uses the incident and his lawyer skills to force the landlord into putting the girls' name on the apartment lease, and he also fine-tunes their application for the dessert shop's liquor license. Final tally for cupcake business venture: $250,072
114	20	"And the Partnership Hits the Fan"	Katy Garretson	Rob Sheridan	April 28, 2016	3J5070	6.61
Randy is invited to a dinner by potential new law partners who have offered him a job in Manhattan, and he asks Max to come along. Max feels out of place at the trendy new restaurant and throws up multiple times after eating the exotic food, making her feel that she and Randy are not right for each other. Also, Sophie and Oleg ask Max and Caroline to be the godparents for their baby. Final tally for cupcake business venture: $250,072
115	21	"And the Ten Inches"	Katy Garretson	Liz Feldman	May 5, 2016	3J5071	6.67
Max and Caroline try to convince the owner of the pizza place next door to rent her back office to them, so they can expand their dessert bar. Final tally for cupcake business venture: $31,000
116	22	"And the Big Gamble"	Michael Patrick King	Michelle Nader & Liz Astrof	May 12, 2016	3J5072	6.99
Max and Caroline learn Han is in trouble with a gang when he cannot pay off a substantial debt he amassed from gambling on women's tennis. The girls decide to settle Han's $30,000 debt in exchange for part ownership in the diner. Final tally for cupcake business venture: $1,000

== Ratings ==
Viewership and ratings per episode of 2 Broke Girls season 5
No.	Title	Air date	Rating/share (18–49)	Viewers (millions)
1	"And the Wrecking Ball"	November 12, 2015	1.6/5	6.34
2	"And the Gym and Juice"	November 19, 2015	1.7/5	6.42
3	"And the Maybe Baby"	November 26, 2015	1.6/5	5.93
4	"And the Inside Outside Situation"	December 10, 2015	1.5/5	5.70
5	"And the Escape Room"	December 17, 2015	1.6/6	6.92
6	"And the Not Regular Down There"	January 6, 2016	1.7/6	6.29
7	"And the Coming Out Party"	January 13, 2016	1.7/6	6.52
8	"And the Basketball Jones"	January 20, 2016	1.7/6	6.64
9	"And the Sax Problem"	January 27, 2016	1.6/6	6.63
10	"And the No New Friends"	February 3, 2016	1.6/5	6.34
11	"And the Booth Babes"	February 10, 2016	1.6/6	6.36
12	"And the Story Telling Show"	February 18, 2016	1.5/5	6.40
13	"And the Lost Baggage"	February 25, 2016	1.7/5	6.56
14	"And You Bet Your Ass"	March 3, 2016	1.7/5	6.74
15	"And the Great Escape"	March 10, 2016	1.6/5	6.54
16	"And the Pity Party Bus"	March 31, 2016	1.6/5	5.69
17	"And the Show and Don't Tell"	April 7, 2016	1.4/5	5.87
18	"And the Loophole"	April 14, 2016	1.5/5	6.25
19	"And the Attack of the Killer Apartment"	April 21, 2016	1.7/6	6.93
20	"And the Partnership Hits the Fan"	April 28, 2016	1.6/5	6.61
21	"And the Ten Inches"	May 5, 2016	1.6/6	6.67
22	"And the Big Gamble"	May 12, 2016	1.7/6	6.99
