= Rafael Morais =

Portuguese actor (born 1989)

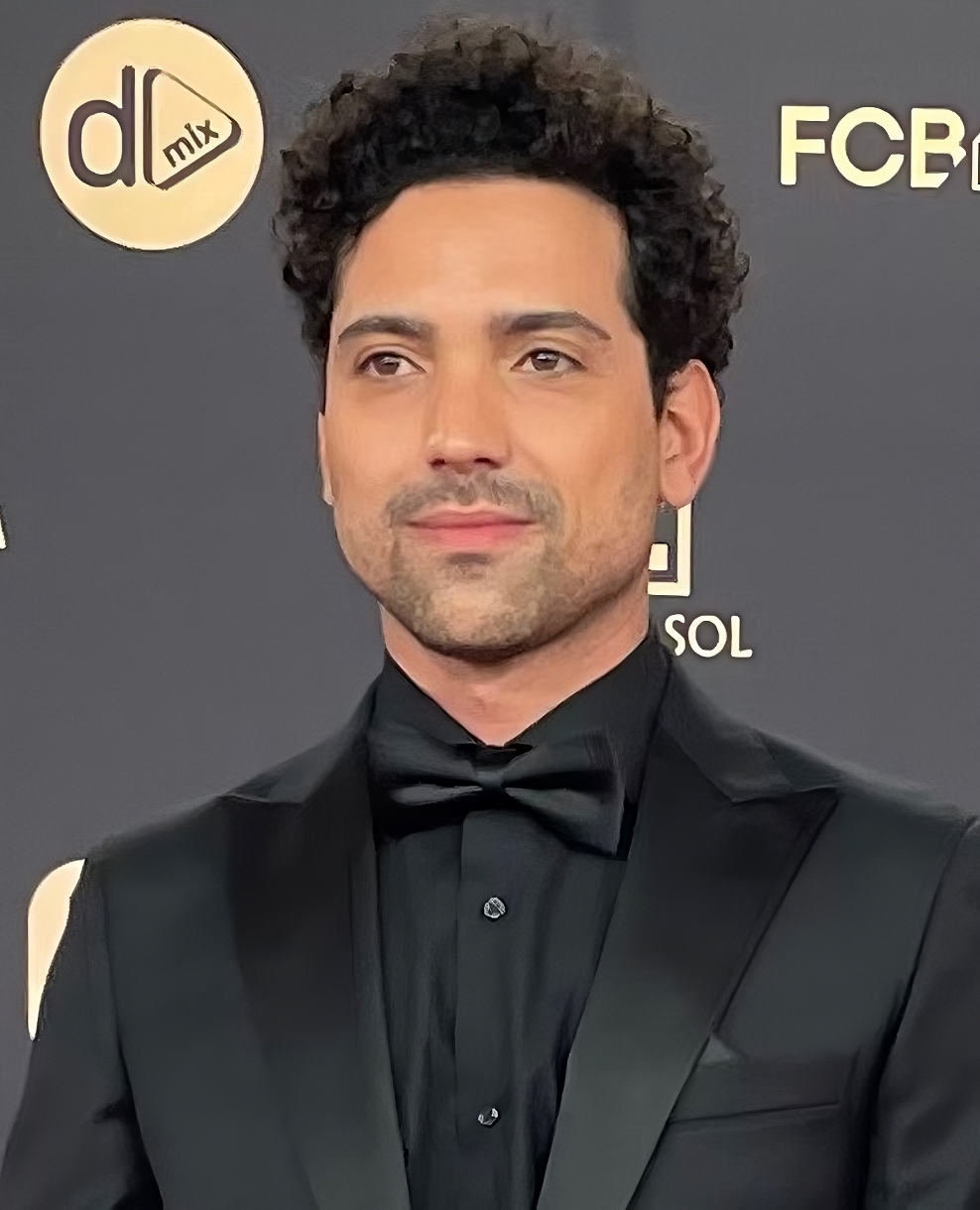
- Morais in 2023
- Born: Portugal
- Occupation: Actor
- Years active: 2003–present

Rafael Morais is a Portuguese actor and film director. He has worked with several globally awarded filmmakers, such as Lav Diaz, Marco Martins, Joao Canijo, and Tiago Guedes. He won the Best Actor prize at the 2023 Prishtina International Film Festival for his performance in Albania's 95th Academy Awards submission, A Cup of Coffee and New Shoes On, which was lauded as one of the best of the year by Variety and Screen International.

== Career ==
Morais has appeared in films including Marco Martins's How to Draw a Perfect Circle (Portugal's official submission to the 82nd Academy Awards and winner of the Best Ensemble Acting Award at the Rio de Janeiro International Film Festival); João Canijo's Blood of My Blood (Portugal's official submission to the 85th Academy Awards); Gentian Koçi's A Cup of Coffee and New Shoes On (Albania's official submission to the 96th Academy Awards); Canijo's Bad Living (Portugal's official submission to the 96th Academy Awards); and the 2025 Cannes Film Festival Official Selection, Magellan, directed by Lav Diaz.

In 2012, he made his directorial debut with the short film You Are the Blood, which he also wrote and starred in.

In 2022, Morais portrayed the Portuguese painter Amadeo de Souza Cardoso in the biopic Amadeo. He is also known for his work in the Netflix series White Lines,Glória, and Turn of the Tide.

== Accolades ==
Morais has been nominated three times as Best Actor at the Portuguese Golden Globes, for the films Blood of My Blood, A Cup of Coffee and New Shoes On, and How to Draw a Perfect Circle.

He has been nominated twice as Best Lead Actor at the Sophia Awards, for his performances in Amadeo and A Cup of Coffee and New Shoes On.

In 2023, Morais won the Best Actor award at the Prishtina International Film Festival for A Cup of Coffee and New Shoes On. His portrayal of the deaf-mute Agim earned him rave reviews, and his work was lauded as "one of the best performances of the year" by Variety.

In 2024, he was selected for the Berlinale Talents development program, and the same year, he was invited to become a permanent member of the European Film Academy.

== Selected filmography ==
=== Film ===
List of film appearances, with year, title, and role shown
Year	Title	Role	Notes
2008	Doomed Love	Manuel Botelho	
2009	How to Draw a Perfect Circle	Guilherme	
2009	L'arc-en-ciel	Gary	
2011	Blood of My Blood	Joca Fialho	Best Lead Actor nomination at the 2011 Globos de Ouro
2011	You Are the Blood	Dan	Writer, director, actor
2012	Joshua Tree, 1951: A Portrait of James Dean	Johny	
2015	Chasing Eagle Rock	Raffa	
2022	Amadeo	Amadeo de Souza Cardoso	Best Lead Actor nomination, Sophia Awards
2022	A Cup of Coffee and New Shoes On	Gezim	Best actor award, 2023 Prishtina International Film Festival; Best Lead Actor nomination, Sophia Awards and Globos de Ouro
2023	Bad Living	Alex	
2023	Living Bad	Alex	
2025	Magellan	Joao Carvalho	

=== Television ===
List of film appearances, with year, title, and role shown
Year	Title	Role	Notes
2020	White Lines	Young Boxer	6 episodes
2021	Glória	Domingos	4 episodes
2023	Turn of the Tide	Morcela	7 episodes
2024	Hotel do Rio	Alex	4 episodes
