= A Cup of Coffee and New Shoes On =

2022 drama film by Gentian Koçi

- Promotional release poster
- Directed by: Gentian Koçi
- Written by: Gentian Koçi
- Produced by: Liridon Cahani; Blerina Hankollari; Gentian Koçi; Konstantina Stavrianou
- Starring: Edgar Morais; Rafael Morais
- Cinematography: Ilias Adamis
- Edited by: Myrto Karra
- Production companies: Added Value Films; Artalb Film; Graal S.A; Maria & Mayer
- Release dates: November 21, 2022 (PÖFF); November 24, 2022 (Albania)
- Running time: 99 minutes
- Countries: Albania; Greece; Kosovo; Portugal
- Languages: Albanian; Albanian Sign Language
- Budget: €750.000

A Cup of Coffee and New Shoes On (Albanian: Një filxhan kafe dhe këpucë të reja veshur) is a 2022 drama film written and directed by Gentian Koçi. It is inspired on a real case where 2 deaf brothers suffer from a degenerative disease that will eventually leave them blind. It stars Edgar Morais and Rafael Morais. The film was selected to represent Albania in the Best International Feature Film category at the 95th Academy Awards. The film was nominated at the Tallinn Black Nights Film Festival in the Critics' Picks Strand section.

== Synopsis ==
In today's Tirana, Agim (Rafael Morais) and Gezim (Edgar Morais), two inseparable deaf-mute identical twin brothers in their forties, live under the same roof. One evening, Agim is driving back home when his sight gets blurred and a fatal accident nearly occurs. At the ophthalmologist, a few days later, the two brothers discover that due to a genetic and rare disease, they will separately, but progressively and irreversibly go blind. Slowly immersing into an unbearable silenced darkness, not being able to see the world and each other anymore, the two brothers have to make a strong decision around a cup of coffee and with new shoes on.

== Cast ==
The actors participating in this film are:

- Edgar Morais as Gezim
- Rafael Morais as Agim
- Drita Kabashi as Ana

== Production ==
Koçi said he found it an intriguing idea to make a film that deals with complex and evolving human relationships and the fundamental question of what happens to a person, when they are completely immersed in darkness and communication with the world becomes difficult. The three lead actors and producer Blerina Hankollari spent six months learning Albanian sign language at the Albanian National Association of the Deaf (ANAD).

== Release ==
The film premiered on November 21, 2022, at the Tallinn Black Nights Film Festival. The film was released in Albanian theaters on November 24, 2022. In 2023 it should reach Portuguese theaters.

== Reception ==
Writing for Variety, Jessica KIang described the film as a "deeply moving brotherhood drama" and praised the film's ability to convey powerful emotions without becoming overly sentimental. She commended the actors' performances and highlighted the exceptional chemistry between the Morais brothers and their portrayal of the twins' unique bond.

In her review for Screen International, film critic Wendy Ide praised the film and described it as a "wrenchingly sad existential drama that is driven by phenomenal performances from Portuguese actor brothers Rafael Morais and Edgar Morais."
