= Dancing in Twilight =

- Directed by: Bob Roe
- Screenplay by: Rishi Vij
- Produced by: Howard Griffith
- Starring: Mimi Rogers; Erick Avari; Kal Penn
- Cinematography: Robert Steadman
- Edited by: Scot J. Kelly
- Music by: Scott Szabo
- Distributed by: Luminous Galaxy Productions Inc.
- Release date: 2005
- Running time: 90 minutes
- Country: United States
- Language: English

Dancing in Twilight is a 2005 American romantic drama film directed by Bob Roe and starring Mimi Rogers, Erick Avari and Kal Penn.

== Cast ==
- Erick Avari as Matt
- Louise Fletcher as Evelyn
- Mimi Rogers as April
- Kal Penn as Sam
- Sheetal Sheth as Nicole
- Artee Patel as Jai
