= How to Draw a Perfect Circle =

2009 Portuguese drama film

- Directed by: Marco Martins
- Screenplay by: Marco Martins: Goncalo M. Tavares
- Starring: Rafael Morais; Daniel Duval; Joana de Verona; Beatriz Batarda
- Music by: Bernardo Sassetti
- Production company: Ukbar Filmes
- Release dates: 25 September 2009 (Rio de Janeiro); 6 May 2010 (Portugal)
- Running time: 95 minutes
- Country: Portugal
- Languages: French; Portuguese

How to Draw a Perfect Circle (Portuguese: Como Desenhar um Círculo Perfeito) is a 2009 Portuguese drama film directed by Marco Martins and starring Rafael Morais, Daniel Duval, Joana de Verona, Beatriz Batarda, and Albano Jeronimo. Its plot revolves around a young man named Guilherme and his sister Sofia who grow up sharing experiences and slowly discovering their sexuality.

== Cast ==
- Rafael Morais as Guilherme
- Daniel Duval as Paul
- Joana de Verona as Sofia
- Beatriz Batarda as Leonor
- Lourdes Norberto as Clara

== Synopsis ==
Guilherme (Rafael Morais) and his sister, Sofia (Joana de Verona), live in their grandmother's mansion, occasionally looked in on by their unconventional mom (Beatriz Batarda). Their dad Paul (Daniel Duval), an emotionally distant intellectual, returns to Portugal from Paris.

Sofia promised Guilherme that when she was ready, he would have the privilege of taking her virginity. Guilherme starts getting impatient, unable to satisfy himself any longer with masturbating by her side. When he sees his sister apparently having sex with another guy, he feels deeply betrayed. His emotional maelstrom is further exacerbated by the news of their grandmother's death.

After their mother decides to sell the ancestral mansion, Guilherme moves in with Paul. Still unhappy, he is once again reduced to self-gratification, this time while watching his father having sex with a prostitute. Before this scene, while father and son play Tic-Tac-Toe, Paul remarks that Guilherme can draw a perfect circle but always loses the game.

== Reception ==
Bernardo Sassetti won the Award for Best Music at the 5th Festival de Cinema de Países de Língua Portuguesa.
