= Ornela Kapetani =

Albanian actress

- Born: Ornela Kapetani; 19 June 1979; Sarandë, Albania
- Occupation: Actress
- Years active: 2005–present

Ornela Kapetani (born 19 June 1979) is an Albanian actress. Kapetani's film credits include the Albanian film Daybreak and the Greek films The Daughter and Correction.
