= Lolawolf =

American R&B and pop duo

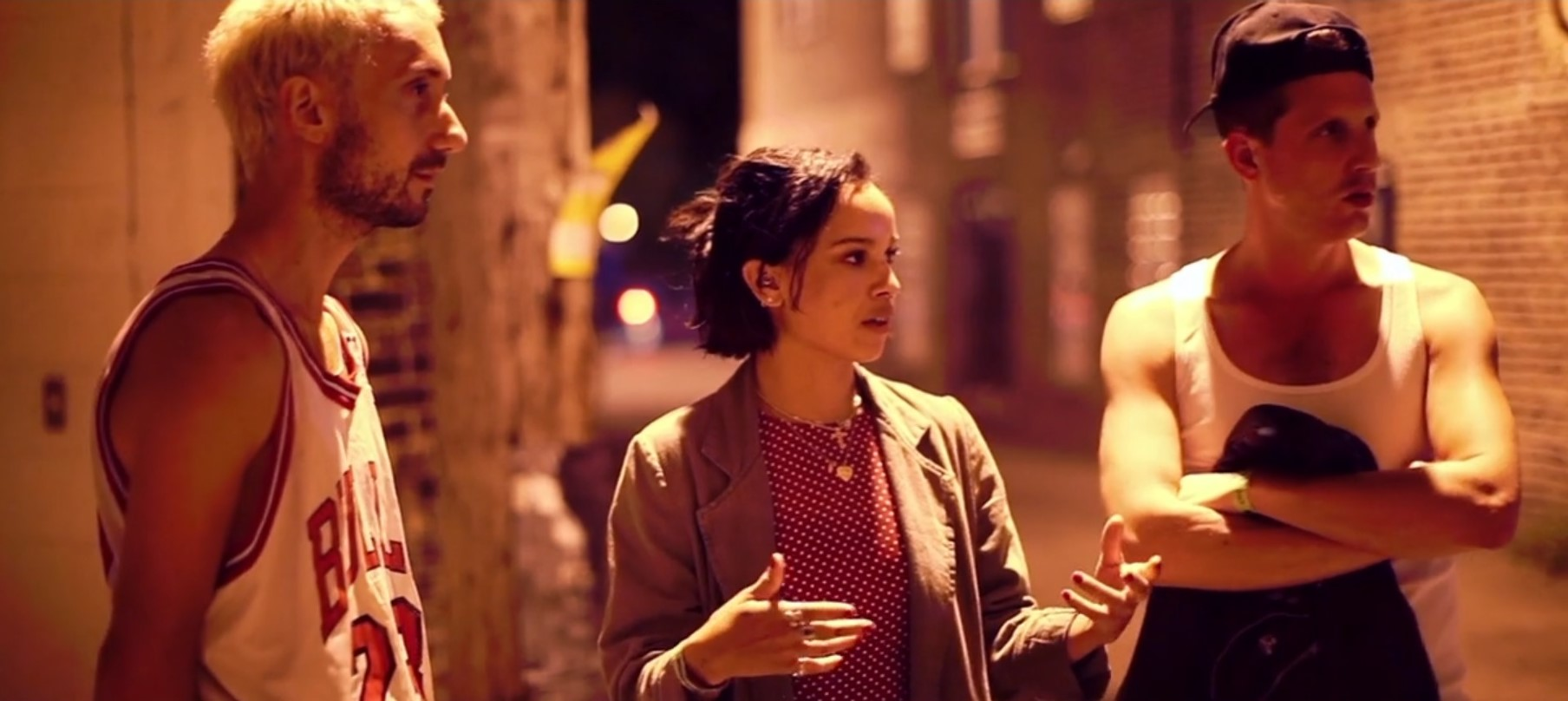
- Lolawolf in 2014

Background information
- Origin: Brooklyn, New York City, United States
- Genres: R&B; electropop; synth-pop
- Labels: Innit Recordings
- Members: Zoë Kravitz; Jimmy Giannopoulos
- Past members: Raviv Ullman
- Website: lolawolf.com

Lolawolf (styled as LOLAWOLF) is an American R&B and electropop duo, formed by actress and singer Zoë Kravitz and drummer and producer Jimmy Giannopoulos, based in Brooklyn, New York City. The band released the self-titled EP, Lolawolf in February 2014, a full-length album titled Calm Down in October 2014 followed by EP Every Fuckin Day in June 2015.

== History ==
Lolawolf is composed of frontwoman Kravitz, and drummer, producer and film maker Jimmy Giannopoulos (also of MOTHXR and Pretty Good Dance Moves). Kravitz became friends with Giannopoulos while living in Brooklyn. They began collaborating on music and released the track "Wanna Have Fun" in May 2013. Kravitz asked them to join her in Los Angeles while working on the independent film The Road Within, to help take her mind off the difficult role of playing an anorexic. The band began recording tracks at movie producer Bruce Cohen's home studio in Hollywood at night. Cohen is Kravitz's godfather. Actor and drummer Raviv Ullman was a member from 2013 to 2014.

Lolawolf debuted at Manhattan's Mercury Lounge in November 2013, and released the self-titled EP, Lolawolf, in February 2014. The band is named after Kravitz's half-siblings, Lola and Nakoa-Wolf, children of her mother, Lisa Bonet and step-father Jason Momoa. They rejected major label offers to release music with the independent label Innit Recordings through Kobalt Label Services, letting them retain creative control. Lolawolf released their debut album, Calm Down, in October 2014, which was recorded in the Bahamas and Las Vegas. Rapper ASAP Rocky appeared in the video for the 2014 single, "Jimmy Franco".

Lolawolf opened for Lily Allen, Azealia Banks, Warpaint, and Miley Cyrus, for her shows in Brisbane, Adelaide and Perth as part of the Bangerz Tour in late 2014. They released the five-track EP, Every Fuckin Day, on June 23, 2015. They toured with Twin Shadow, and performed at Austin's South by Southwest, the Paris Afropunk, and Philadelphia's Made in America music festivals in 2015. In 2016, they appeared at Lollapalooza, released the song, "Teardrop", featuring Miley Cyrus, and were currently in the studio recording a follow-up to the EP Every Fuckin Day, reportedly titled Prom.

== Discography ==
=== Studio albums ===
Title	Details	Track listing
Calm Down	Released: October 21, 2014; Label: Innit Recordings; Formats: CD, digital download, LP	1. "Calm Down"; 2. "Ayo"; 3. "Jimmy Franco"; 4. "Bitch"; 5. "Dirty Feeling"; 6. "Skipping Days"; 7. "What Love Is"; 8. "What's Up"; 9. "Stay With Me"; 10. "Start Now Stop"; 11. "Only You"; 12. "Take a Hint"
Tenderness	Released: July 3, 2020; Label: Innit Recordings; Format: Digital download	1. "Heart Attack"; 2. "Whole House"; 3. "Do Ya Think?"; 4. "Not Diana"; 5. "Tenderness"; 6. "Girl Crush"; 7. "It Was Real"

=== EPs ===
Title	Details	Track listing
Lolawolf	Released: February 4, 2014; Label: Innit Recordings; Formats: Digital download	1. "Drive (Los Angeles)"; 2. "What Love Is"; 3. ”Too Lovely"; 4. "Chainz"; 5. "Wanna Have Fun"
Everyfuckinday	Released: June 23, 2015; Label: Innit Recordings; Formats: Digital download	1. "Every Fuckin Day"; 2. "House Key"; 3. "Real4U"; 4. "Normally I Get"; 5. "Risky Business"

=== Singles ===
Title	Year	Album
"Drive (Los Angeles)"	2013	Lolawolf
"Wanna Have Fun"	2013	Lolawolf
"Jimmy Franco"	2014	Calm Down
"Summertime"	2014	—
"AYO"	2014	Calm Down
"Every Fuckin Day"	2015	Every Fuckin Day
"Teardrop"	2016	—
"Baby I'm Dyin'"	2017	—
"Not Diana"	2020	Tenderness

== Music videos ==
Title	Year	Director(s)	Ref
"Wanna Have Fun"	2013	Jonathan Hoeg	
"What Love Is"	2014	Jonathan Hoeg	
"Drive (Los Angeles)"	2014	Jordan Harkins	
"Jimmy Franco"	2014	Jonathan Hoeg	
"Summertime"	2014		
"AYO"	2014	Trouble Andrew	
"Calm Down"	2014	Jonathan Hoeg	
"Bitch"	2015	Trouble Andrew	
"Every Fuckin Day"	2015	Trouble Andrew	
