= Joana de Verona =

Brazilian-Portuguese actress

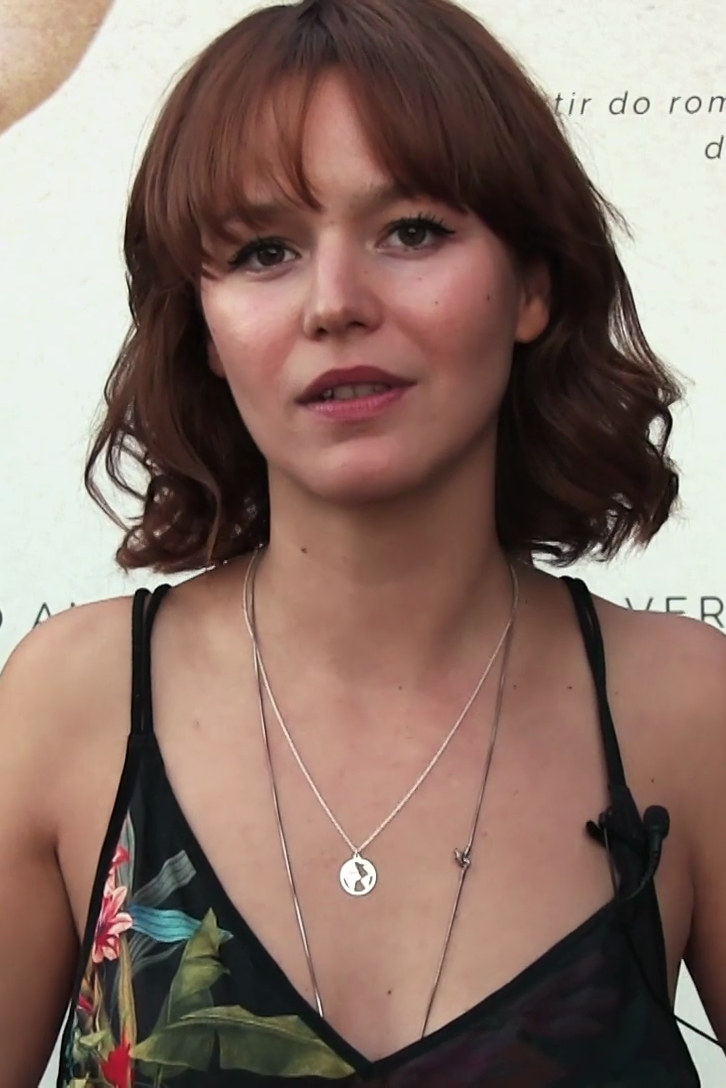
- Joana de Verona in 2018
- Born: Joana de Verona Correia de Vilela Machado Borges; 8 December 1989 (age 36); São Luís, Maranhão, Brazil
- Occupation: Actress
- Years active: 2001–present

Joana de Verona Correia de Vilela Machado Borges (born 8 December 1989) is a Brazilian-Portuguese actress. She has appeared in more than forty films and series since 2001.

She graduated with an MFA in Theater from the Lisbon Theatre and Film School. She has worked with theater directors such as Carlos Avillez, Luis Miguel Cintra, Gonçalo Amorim, Marco Martins, Monica Garnel, Monica Calle. She works in countries such as Brazil, France, Portugal, Germany and Italy.

Daughter of parents from Trás-os-Montes and Alto Douro, she was born in São Luís (MA) and came to Portugal at 9 months old. The youngest of four sisters, Verona's name is not a surname, but a given name. Her parents were, respectively, an economist and a primary school teacher.

== Selected filmography ==
Film
Year	Title	Role	Notes
2015	Arabian Nights		
2010	Mysteries of Lisbon		
2009	How to Draw a Perfect Circle		

TV
Year	Title	Role	Notes
2024	Mania de Você	Filipa	
2019	Éramos Seis	Adelaide Amaral Sampaio	
2017	Ouro Verde	Bia	
2015	A Única Mulher		
