= Chasing Eagle Rock =

- Directed by: Erick Avari
- Written by: Erick Avari
- Starring: Michael Welch; Erick Avari; Rafael Morais; Edgar Morais
- Release date: 2015
- Country: United States
- Language: English

Chasing Eagle Rock is a 2015 film written and directed by Erick Avari and starring Michael Welch, Avari, Rafael Morais, Edgar Morais, and Robert Cicchini.

== Cast ==
- Michael Welch as J.R.
- Erick Avari as Cam Avery
- Mary-Margaret Humes as Mags Avery
- Robert Cicchini as Joe Paul
- Beth Behrs as Deborah
- Lauren Tom as Roxanne
- Edgar Morais as Jaffa
- Rafael Morais as Raffa
- Ashley Gardner
