= From Now On (film) =

- From Now On poster
- Directed by: Catarina Ruivo
- Written by: Catarina Ruivo; Antonio Figueiredo
- Produced by: Paulo Branco
- Starring: Luís Miguel Cintra; Adelaide de Sousa; Edgar Morais; Alexandre Pinto; Rita Durão
- Music by: Vasco Pimentel
- Distributed by: Lusomundo
- Release dates: September 2007 (Festival of Rio); January 24, 2008 (Portugal)
- Running time: 102 minutes
- Country: Portugal
- Language: Portuguese

From Now On (Portuguese: Daqui P'ra Frente) is a 2007 Portuguese film directed by Catarina Ruivo, written by Ruivo and Antonio Figueiredo and produced by Paulo Branco. The film stars Luís Miguel Cintra, Adelaide de Sousa, Antonio Figueiredo, Edgar Morais and Alexandre Pinto.

== Plot ==
Dora (Adelaide de Sousa) divides her time between her work as a beautician, her life with her police officer husband António (Luís Miguel Cintra), and her involvement in left-wing politics.

== Cast ==
- Luís Miguel Cintra as Antonio
- Adelaide de Sousa as Dora
- Edgar Morais as Nelson
- Alexandre Pinto as Jorge
- Antonio Figueiredo as Policeman

== Release ==
From Now On screened for the first time in 2007 at the Rio Film Festival, (Rio de Janeiro, Brazil) and was widely released in Portugal, France and Germany on September 18, 2007. The official premiere took place in Lisbon, Portugal on January 24, 2008.

=== Awards ===
2008 Caminhos do Cinema Português

- Won: Best Film
