= Joshua Tree, 1951: A Portrait of James Dean =

2012 American drama film

- DVD cover
- Directed by: Matthew Mishory
- Written by: Matthew Mishory
- Based on: James Dean
- Produced by: Edward Singletary Jr.; Randall Walk; Robert Zimmer Jr.
- Starring: James Preston; Dan Glenn; Erin Daniels; Clare Grant; Rafael Morais; Edgar Morais
- Cinematography: Michael Marius Pessah
- Edited by: Chris Kirkpatrick
- Music by: Steven Severin; Arban Ornelas
- Color process: Black and White; 35 mm movie film
- Production company: Iconoclastic Features
- Distributed by: Iconoclastic Features; Wolfe Releasing
- Release dates: May 24, 2012; SIFF
- Running time: 93 minutes
- Country: United States
- Language: English

Joshua Tree, 1951: A Portrait of James Dean (also known as A Portrait of James Dean: Joshua Tree, 1951) is a 2012 American independent drama film written and directed by Matthew Mishory, in his feature film debut. It stars James Preston, Dan Glenn, Erin Daniels, Clare Grant, Rafael Morais and Edgar Morais. The movie is a portrait of the pre-fame James Dean and his bisexual proclivities. The film had its world premiere at the Seattle International Film Festival on May 24, 2012 and had additional screenings as an official selection at the Transilvania International Film Festival, Rio de Janeiro International Film Festival, Outfest: The Los Angeles Gay & Lesbian Film Festival and the Frameline Film Festival. It had a limited theatrical release on December 12, 2012, and was released to DVD on June 4, 2013.

== Synopsis ==
The film focuses on the time-span of 1950 to 1951, right before Dean takes off to New York, where he is discovered by Elia Kazan as a stage actor. The movie starts with Dean taking a trip to Joshua Tree, accompanied by the never named 'Roommate', who he is sexually involved with, and Violet, a struggling actress who is prone to giving advice to Dean. The film portrays Dean as having sex with men and women, and movie studio executives as well.

== Cast ==
- James Preston as James Dean
- Dan Glenn as The Roommate
- Dalilah Rain as Violet
- Erin Daniels as The Roommate's Mother
- Clare Grant as Beverly
- Rafael Morais as Johny
- Edward Singletary as Roger
- Darri Ingolfsson as James DeWeerd
- Edgar Morais as Franco
- Christopher Higgins as Arthur Rimbaud
- Jay Donnell as Preston
- Clint Catalyst as Johnny the Bartender
- Jeff Harnar as The Nightclub Singer
- Robert Gant as The Famous Director

== Production notes ==
Director and writer Matthew Mishory told Filmmaker Magazine the project began as a short film in 2010. He said filming took place over multiple days in Joshua Tree, California, and after returning to Los Angeles, a trailer he posted online for the project went viral, so after discussions with his production team, they decided to make a feature film instead. Mishory said the time-frame of 1950 to 1951 was chosen for the film because it's when hardly anyone had really taken notice of him, and that period was less commonly portrayed in previous films about him. He also revealed that the movie was always going to be shot in black and white, with modern elements incorporated into it like macro lens shots and very long zoom shots, to prevent the film from looking like it was just a recreation "of a film from 1951". Mishory describes the sex scenes between the characters in the film as omnisexual, and said in small cities where it screened, those scenes were sometimes controversial, but his thoughts were; how can "something that is common knowledge" be controversial, "so [to him] the film and its content are entirely non-controversial". Mishory also addressed the stories about Dean being "a human ashtray" in the film, which were rumors that Dean liked people putting out cigarettes on his body. He said that regardless of whether the rumors were true or not, "Dean certainly propagated it", and probably "would have enjoyed the legacy that he’s left in all its ambiguities".

In an interview with SIFF News, Mishory emphasized the film is a portrait, not a biopic or biography, because the film is a moment in time about James Dean, set very narrowly in the year before he really became known. Mishory also described the film as being a portrait to Out Magazine, and said that gave him additional flexibility to discover the truth about who Dean was, and "not just as an artist or an actor, but also as a person". Jessica Baxter argued in Film Threat the reason Mishory describes the film as a "portrait", rather than a biopic is because he produced an "art house film", which gives him immense freedom in his storytelling. Baxter opined that it is more difficult to "criticize art than it is traditional film because the very nature of the format is open to interpretation".

== Critical reception ==
Writing in Film International, Robert Kenneth Dator described the film as shedding new light on Dean's persona: "Who was James Byron Dean? It is certain no one knows—not to a certainty, not all of the living embodiment of mystique that was James Dean, not all of him. A Portrait of James Dean renders the finest speculation yet offered. But more than this, and most significantly, writer/director Matthew Mishory has managed to capture an austere beauty of a kind little known and little understood by all but the likes of Baudelaire." Noting the film was both "sensuous" but also dark, the BFI's Sight & Sound magazine described the film as "a gorgeous, solemn portrait of a young man willing to compromise to meet his ambitions." Artforum's Travis Jeppeson also focused on these themes, noting that "Matthew Mishory, in his directorial debut, has chosen to focus on the year before Dean’s star rose. By homing in on this seemingly tiny slice of time, the film manages a nuanced portrayal of an entire era, as well as a somewhat damning appraisal of the Hollywood system that endures to this day".

Neil Young wrote in The Hollywood Reporter that the film is a "notably good-looking but disappointingly" portrait of James Dean, which stresses a prurient prominence on "between-the-sheets shenanigans". Young did commend cinematographer Michael Marius Pessah though for his use of monochrome 35 mm movie film. Richard Knight from the Windy City Times also praised Pessah for his "eye-catching, gorgeous black-and-white cinematography". Additionally, Knight noted that Dean's "innate queerness and equal appeal to both straight and gay audiences was and is undeniable...and Mishory's film "lyrically reclaims him as one of our own". Alissa Simon wrote in her review for Variety that the film depicts Dean as a "bisexual hustler with a crippled soul, pursuing his dream of stardom through sexual trysts...but overall, it is a "solid indie craft package". Jessica Baxter with Film Threat said the film unintentionally does Dean an injustice by using "pseudo-intellectual dialog", and when you combine that with an unsettling and rigid performance by James Preston, "one comes away with the impression that James Dean was actually worth little more than a pretty face and a roll in the hay". Baxter said the film's redemption though is through its robust visuals, with loads of beautiful and naked people, and the graphic love scenes, all of which "keep you from getting too bored". Baxter was also impressed with Pessah's black and white cinematography, calling it "breathtaking", and said "naked butts look terrific on black and white film".

Terrence Butcher from Pop Matters said "Mishory doesn't shy away from depicting an under-the-radar gay frisson that likely existed in those conservative times...and it's possible that the film could simultaneously be denounced and celebrated as a queer appropriation of Dean's life, depending on one's political persuasion". David Wiegand wrote that James Preston gives a credible performance as Dean, and even though the movie "borders on art-film pretentiousness here and there, there's no question that it's also mesmerizing and sexy". Edward Davidson of The MacGuffin also commented that the film has a vibe of "pretentious art house film" surrounding it, but according to Davidson, "just because you have characters quoting Rimbeaud and citing their love of Hemingway doesn't mean your film is deep". He graded the film D+. Allstair Newton from Xtra Magazine complimented the film for the beauty of its cinematography, along with the "male pulchritude, and the pansexual exploits of Dean, to several scenes of clothing-optional pool parties".

== Accolades and selections ==
- FilmOut San Diego (winner Best Cinematography)
- Image+Nation LGBT Montreal Film Festival (winner Best Feature Film)
- Outfest: The Los Angeles Gay & Lesbian Film Festival (winner Best Cinematography and Official Selection)
- Guadalajara International Film Festival (nominee Best Feature Film)
- Chéries-Chéris (nominee Best Feature Film)
- Seattle International Film Festival (World Premiere)
- Transilvania International Film Festival (Official Selection)
- Rio de Janeiro International Film Festival (Official Selection)
- Frameline Film Festival (Official Selection)

== See also ==
- Death of James Dean
- James Dean: Portrait of a Friend
- William Bast
