= Daybreak (2017 film) =

2017 film by Gentian Koçi

- Film poster
- Directed by: Gentian Koçi
- Written by: Gentian Koçi
- Produced by: Gentian Koçi
- Starring: Ornela Kapetani
- Cinematography: Ilias Adamis
- Edited by: Christos Giannakopoulos; Bonita Papastathi
- Music by: Mardit Lleshi
- Production companies: Artalb Film; Graal Films
- Release date: 13 August 2017 (Sarajevo IFF)
- Running time: 85 minutes
- Country: Albania
- Language: Albanian

Daybreak (Albanian: Dita zë fill) is a 2017 Albanian drama film directed by Gentian Koçi. A coproduction between Albanian and Greek companies, it was selected as the Albanian entry for the Best Foreign Language Film at the 90th Academy Awards, but it was not nominated.

== Plot ==
Leta (Ornela Kapetani) has not been able to pay the rent for several months. When she and her one-year-old son are thrown out of their apartment, they move in with Sophie, an old woman confined to bed, whose daughter has just employed Leta as a caretaker. In order to keep her job and a roof over their head, Leta has to keep Sophie alive at any cost.

== Cast ==
- Ornela Kapetani as Leta
- Suzana Prifti as Sophie
- Kasem Hoxha as Postman
- Hermes Kasimati as Leta's son
- Adele Gjoka as Ola

== Production ==
Gentian Koçi, a documentary filmmaker, made his feature film directorial debut with Daybreak. It was a coproduction between the Albanian Artalb Film and Greek Graal Films financed by the National Center of Cinematography, Albania's Ministry of Economy, Culture and Innovation, RTSH, Greek Film Centre, Eurimages, and the city government of Tirana. Christos Giannakopoulos and Bonita Papastathi edited the film.

== Release ==
Wide Management, a French company, managed the international sales for Daybreak. It premiered at the Sarajevo Film Festival in August 2017. Albania selected The Delegation as its nominee for the Academy Award for Best International Feature Film at the 90th Academy Awards, but it was not one of the finalists.

== Reception ==
Boyd van Hoeij, writing for The Hollywood Reporter, described Ilias Adamis's cinematography as "rigorously composed fixed shots"

== Accolades ==
The film received positive reviews during the premiere at the Sarajevo Film Festival. The main Actress, Ornela Kapetani won Best Actress in the Festival.

The director, Gentian Koçi won the Best Director Award during the 15th edition of Tirana International Film Festival. The film also made the Nordic premiere in the Stockholm International Film Festival.

== See also ==
- List of submissions to the 90th Academy Awards for Best Foreign Language Film
- List of Albanian submissions for the Academy Award for Best Foreign Language Film

== Works cited ==
- "Daybreak". Cineuropa. Archived from the original on 6 April 2025.
- Economou, Vassilis (19 September 2017). "Albania enters the Oscar race with Daybreak". Cineuropa. Archived from the original on 6 April 2025.
- Holdsworth, Nick (18 September 2017). "Oscars: Albania Selects 'Daybreak' for Foreign-Language Category". The Hollywood Reporter. Archived from the original on 6 April 2025.
- Meza, Ed (13 August 2017). "Sarajevo: Albanian Director Gentian Koçi Breaks Ground With First Feature Film, 'Daybreak'". Variety. Archived from the original on 6 April 2025.
- Petković, Vladan (14 August 2017). "Daybreak: Between the ethical and the existential". Cineuropa. Archived from the original on 16 December 2024.
- van Hoeij, Boyd (16 October 2017). "'Daybreak' ('Dita za fill'): Film Review". The Hollywood Reporter. Archived from the original on 6 April 2025.
