= Catarina Ruivo =

Portuguese film director

Catarina Ruivo (b. Coimbra, 1971), Portuguese film director.

Catarina Ruivo studied at the Escola Superior de Teatro e Cinema in Lisbon, specializing her studies in cinematography editing.

Later she directed and edited the short film Uma Cerveja no Inverno which premiered at the (Short-film Festival of Vila do Conde) in 1998, and screened at the (Oberhausen Festival), among others.

Her first feature film, André Valente, was released in Portugal, France and Spain after being presented in many festivals, such as the (Locarno Film Festival) in 2004 where it won the D. Quixote award, offered by the International Federation of Film Societies; the Gwangju Film Festival, (South Korea), winning the Critic Award and the Young Cinema Jury Award; Belfort Film Festival; Angers Film Festival; Infinity Film Festival, (Turin) winning the Albacinema Award for Best Director and the Signis Award for Best Film.

Her latest feature film is From Now On (Daqui P'ra Frente), starring Edgar Morais, Luís Miguel Cintra, Rita Durão and Adelaide de Sousa.
