= Mothxr =

American synth-pop band

MOTHXR
- Origin: Brooklyn, New York, U.S.
- Genres: Indie pop; synth-pop; new wave; R&B
- Years active: 2013–present
- Labels: Kitsuné; Washington Square Music
- Members: Penn Badgley; Jimmy Giannopoulos; Simon Oscroft; Darren Will

Mothxr (stylized as MOTHXR) is an American synth-pop band from Brooklyn, New York. Formed in late 2013, the group makes synth-heavy pop music influenced by new wave and R&B. The four-piece features vocalist Penn Badgley, producer Jimmy Giannopoulos, guitarist Simon Oscroft, and bassist Darren Will. They released their debut and so far only album, Centerfold, in 2016.

== History ==
MOTHXR was formed in late 2013 by the producer Jimmy Giannopoulos (Lolawolf) and actor and singer Penn Badgley. They were joined by bassist Darren Will and guitarist Simon Oscroft, a New Zealand expat.

In early 2014, they released the song "Easy" on SoundCloud under the name M O T H E R; the track quickly gained popularity and was posted on numerous blogs. "Easy" reached the top ten on the music discovery blog Hype Machine and number one on Billboard's Twitter-based Emerging Artists chart. Months later, the band changed the spelling of their name to MOTHXR, citing a cease-and-desist from another band with a similar name. Badgley later described the name as "tragically hipster."

In 2015, MOTHXR signed with the labels Kitsuné and Washington Square Music, the New York City-based subdivision of the Razor & Tie label. In February 2016, they released their debut album, Centerfold.

== Musical style ==
MOTHXR's music has been described as "synth-heavy, '80s new wave and R&B-influenced pop". Badgley has said the band's music lies "somewhere between DIY punk production aesthetic, new wave and R&B", naming influences like LCD Soundsystem, Beastie Boys, and Arthur Russell. He has also cited D'Angelo as a favorite artist. Critics have noted influences ranging from Joy Division and Simple Minds to Hall & Oates and Michael McDonald.

== Band members ==
- Penn Badgley – vocals, keyboards
- Darren Will – bass guitar
- Simon Oscroft – guitar
- Jimmy Giannopoulos – production, drum programming

== Discography ==
Studio albums

- Centerfold (2016)

Singles

- "Easy" (2014)
- "Touch" (2015)
- "Victim" (2015)
- "She Can't Tell" (2015)
- "Wild Ride" (2015)
- "Stranger" (2015)
- "Underground" (2015)
- "Impossible" (2015)
