= Gentian Koçi =

Albanian film director (born 1979)

- Born: 1979 (age 46–47); Tirana, Albania
- Occupations: Film director Screenwriter
- Years active: 2008–present

Gentian Koçi (born 1979) is an Albanian film director and screenwriter. He is best known for writing and directing the films Daybreak and A Cup of Coffee and New Shoes On, both were selected as the Albanian entry in the Best Foreign Language Film at the 90th Academy Awards and the 95th Academy Awards respectively.

== Selected filmography ==
- Daybreak (2017)
- A Cup of Coffee and New Shoes On (2022)
