= Beth Behrs =

American actress (born 1985)

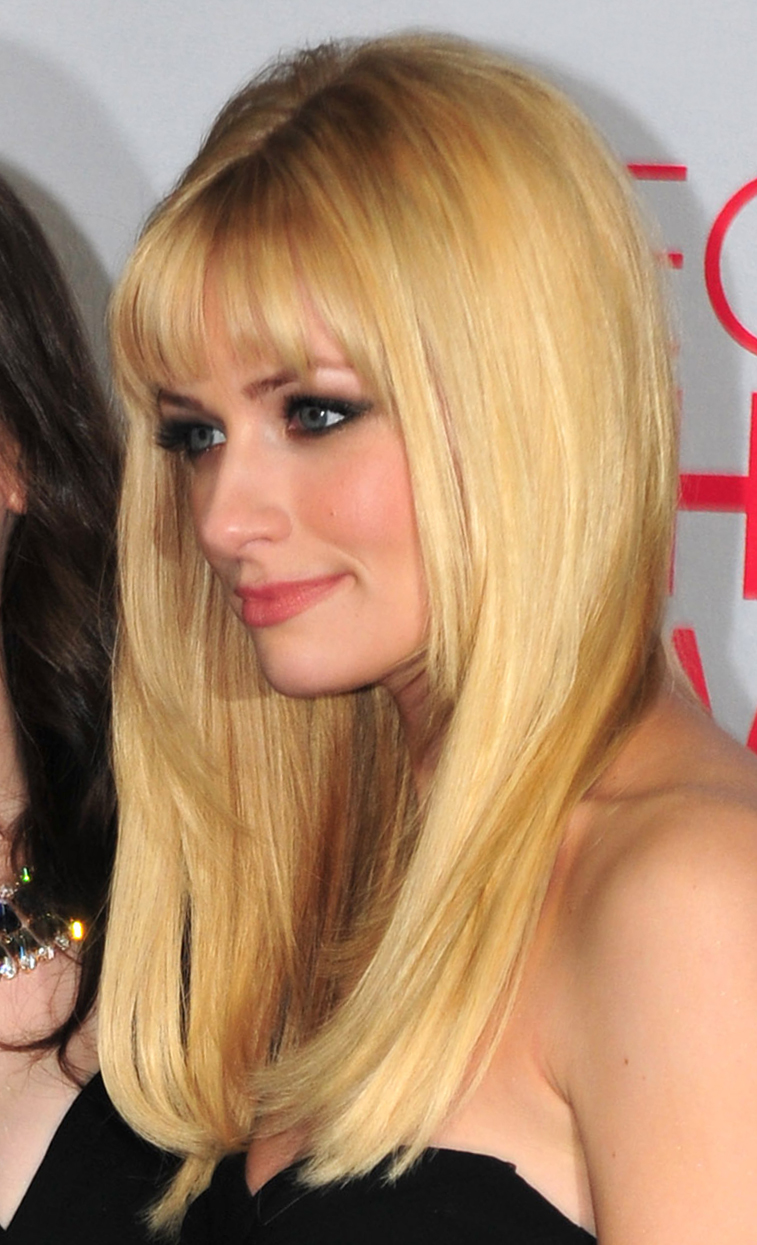
- Behrs at the 38th People's Choice Awards in 2012
- Born: December 26, 1985 (age 40); Lancaster, Pennsylvania, U.S.
- Education: University of California, Los Angeles (BA)
- Occupation: Actress
- Years active: 2009–present
- Spouse: Michael Gladis (m. 2018)
- Children: 1

Beth Behrs (born December 26, 1985) is an American actress. She is known for her starring role as Caroline Channing in the CBS comedy series 2 Broke Girls. The show ran for six seasons and earned Behrs praise and nominations for the Teen Choice and the People's Choice Awards. Having made her screen debut in the 2009 comedy film American Pie Presents: The Book of Love, she later ventured into television roles. After 2 Broke Girls, Behrs returned to feature films with the 2015 productions Chasing Eagle Rock and Hello, My Name Is Doris. She voiced Carrie Williams in the animated film Monsters University (2013) and Moochie in the television series Home: Adventures with Tip & Oh. In 2018, she was cast in her second major TV role, playing Gemma Johnson in the CBS sitcom The Neighborhood.

In addition to her acting career, Behrs has authored a self-help book and written the young-adult webcomic Dents. She is also a philanthropist and the founder of the SheHerdPower Foundation, which helps victims of sexual assaults.

== Early life and education ==
Behrs was born in Lancaster, Pennsylvania, the elder daughter of David Behrs, a college administrator, and Maureen Behrs, a first-grade teacher. She has a sister who is six years younger. In 1989, her family moved to Springfield, Virginia, and later to Lynchburg, Virginia, where she was raised. She began performing in theater at age four and played soccer while growing up. She was a student at E.C. Glass High School.

At age 15, Behrs relocated with her family to Marin County, California. She began attending Tamalpais High School in 2001, and was accepted into the school's highly regarded drama program. She graduated from that high school in 2004. Behrs studied at the American Conservatory Theater in San Francisco, and went on to perform in the musical Dangling Conversations: The Music of Simon and Garfunkel, and the plays Korczak's Children and A Bright Room Called Day. She was classically trained as a singer.

Behrs moved to Los Angeles, California, in 2004, to study acting at the UCLA School of Theater, Film and Television. In 2005, she played Sandy Dumbrowski in a production of Grease at San Francisco's Ray of Light Theatre, and was named Miss Marin County in 2006. She began auditioning for roles in her senior year and graduated in 2008 with a bachelor's degree in critical studies. Behrs was awarded a Young Musician's Foundation Vocal Scholarship after graduating from the college.

== Career ==
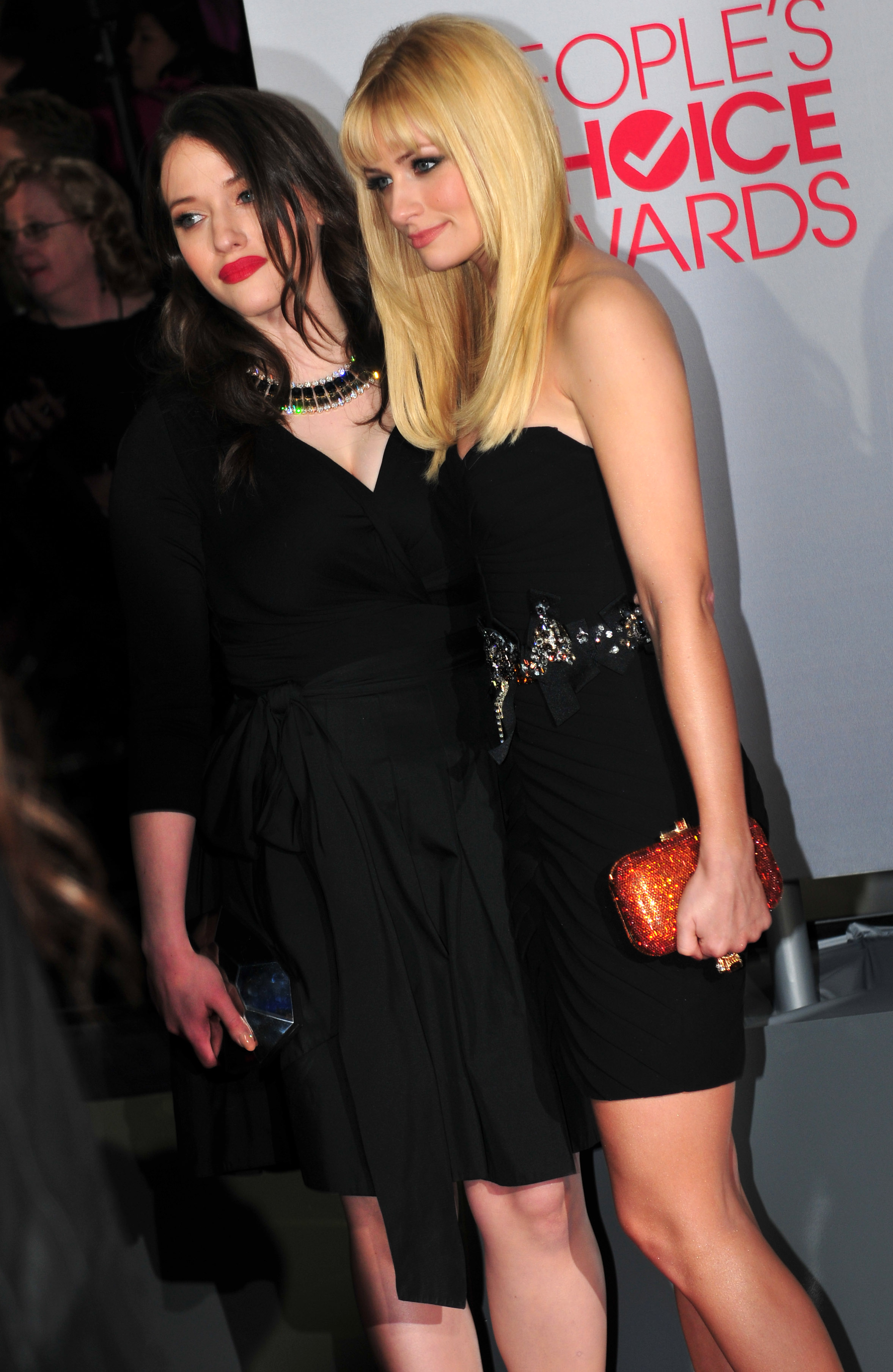
2 Broke Girls co-stars Kat Dennings and Behrs at the 38th People's Choice Awards on January 11, 2012.

Behrs landed her first film role in the teen comedy American Pie Presents: The Book of Love, which she filmed in Vancouver for seven weeks beginning in March 2009. The seventh in the American Pie series, the film was released direct-to-video on December 22, 2009. She next starred in Adventures of Serial Buddies, an independent comedy about an inept group of serial killers produced by TV personality Maria Menounos. The film also starred Christopher Lloyd, Kathie Lee Gifford, and Artie Lange. In late 2010, Behrs shot the independent feature, Route 30, Too!, in Chambersburg, Pennsylvania, playing an alien girl.

Behrs began working in television with guest appearances on NCIS: Los Angeles and ABC's Castle. In 2011, she was working as a nanny and at the Geffen Playhouse in Westwood, when she auditioned for the CBS sitcom 2 Broke Girls. She landed the lead role after seven auditions. Behrs stars as Caroline Channing, an heiress from Manhattan's Upper East Side, who is forced to become a waitress at a diner in Williamsburg, Brooklyn after her father is arrested for financial wrongdoing. Her character is a graduate of the Wharton School who teams up with a waitress named Max (Kat Dennings) in a business venture. The series is produced by comedian Whitney Cummings and Sex and the City-producer Michael Patrick King. In March 2016, CBS renewed the series for a sixth season. On May 12, 2017, the series was cancelled after six seasons.

In 2013, Behrs appeared on It's a Brad, Brad World, a Bravo reality television series featuring fashion stylist Brad Goreski. Behrs was also a presenter at the 2013 Academy of Country Music Awards. She voiced sorority girl Carrie Williams that year in the Disney/Pixar animated film Monsters University, a prequel to 2001's Monsters, Inc.. She starred alongside Sally Field and Max Greenfield in the independent comedy, Hello, My Name Is Doris, directed by Michael Showalter. Behrs and Kat Dennings hosted the 40th People's Choice Awards, where she also sang Miley Cyrus' "Wrecking Ball". She has also sang numerous times on 2 Broke Girls and The Neighborhood.

Behrs made her Manhattan stage debut in June 2016 at the Lucille Lortel Theatre in Halley Feiffer's comedic play, A Funny Thing Happened on the Way to the Gynecologic Oncology Unit at Memorial Sloan-Kettering Cancer Center of New York City. Between 2016 and 2019, she made the young-adult webcomic Dents with childhood friend Matt Doyle. Inspired by X-Men comics, the webcomic explores themes such as sexuality, feminism and environmental issues. Behrs released the book The Total Me-Tox: How to Ditch Your Diet, Move Your Body & Love Your Life in May 2017, in which she shares her personal journey towards health and happiness. Beginning in 2018, Behrs starred as Gemma Johnson in the CBS sitcom The Neighborhood.

== Philanthropy ==
During her time in college, Behrs was a volunteer at Children of the Night, an organisation that assists children who have been forced into prostitution.

Behrs founded SheHerdPower Foundation, which pairs women with horses, to provide therapy to victims of sexual assault.

== Personal life ==
Behrs and actor Michael Gladis were engaged on July 10, 2016, after a six year relationship. They appeared in a short film together, The Argument, in 2012, for the comedy website Funny or Die. On July 21, 2018, she married Gladis at Moose Creek Ranch in Victor, Idaho, just outside Jackson Hole. Behrs and Gladis have a daughter, born in 2022.

Behrs is a fan of country music and has presented awards at the ACM, CMT and CMA Awards and appeared in Lady A's "Downtown" music video and became friends with them afterwards. In 2020, she began hosting Harmonics with Beth Behrs, a podcast where she interviews country and bluegrass singers and songwriters with guests including Glennon Doyle, Geeta Novotny, Mickey Guyton, Brandi Carlile, Tichina Arnold, Allison Russell and Mary Gauthier.

Behrs began equine therapy in 2011 to help manage panic attacks and anxiety that she had experienced since she was a teenager.

== Filmography ==
=== Film ===
Year	Title	Role	Notes
2009	American Pie Presents: The Book of Love	Heidi	Direct to video
2011	Adventures of Serial Buddies	Brittany	
2012	Route 30, Too!	Alien girl	
2013	Monsters University	PNK Carrie	Voice role
2013	So You Think You Can Prance	Joanna	Short film
2014	Judy Greer Is the Best Friend	Sarah	Short film
2015	Chasing Eagle Rock	Deborah	
2015	Hello, My Name Is Doris	Brooklyn	

=== TV ===
Year	Title	Role	Notes
2010	NCIS: Los Angeles	Female caroler	Episode: "Disorder"
2011	Starf*ckers	Cater waitress	
2011	Castle	Ginger	Episode: "Slice of Death"
2011	Pretty Tough	Regen	
2011–2024	The Talk	Herself	Guest and guest co-host;
2011–2017	2 Broke Girls	Caroline Wesbox Channing	Main role role Nominated – Teen Choice Award for Choice TV Breakout Star: Female; Nominated – People's Choice Award for Favorite TV Gal Pals (with Kat Dennings)
2012–2023	Live with Kelly and Mark	Herself	Guest and guest co-host
2014	40th People's Choice Awards	Herself	Host
2014–2023	Entertainment Tonight	Herself	Guest and guest co-host
2015	Repeat After Me	Herself	1 episode
2016	Home: Adventures with Tip & Oh	Moochie	Voice
2016	The Call Room	Jeannie	Voice
2018	Culture Clash	Jenny	Television film
2018	The Big Bang Theory	Nell	Episode: "The Separation Triangulation"
2018–2026	The Neighborhood	Gemma Johnson	Main role Nominated – Family Film Award for Outstanding Actor in a TV Series
2019	No Activity	Sophie Beyers	Episode: "Googy"
2020	Celebrity Family Feud	Herself / Contestant	Episode: "Cedric The Entertainer vs. Wayne Brady and The Hills: New Beginnings vs. Jersey Shore: Family Vacation"
2026	Shifting Gears	Dr. Johnson	TBA

=== Music Videos ===
Year	Title	Artist	Role
2013	"Downtown"	Lady Antebellum	Hillary's friend
