= Erick Avari =

Indian-American actor (born 1952)

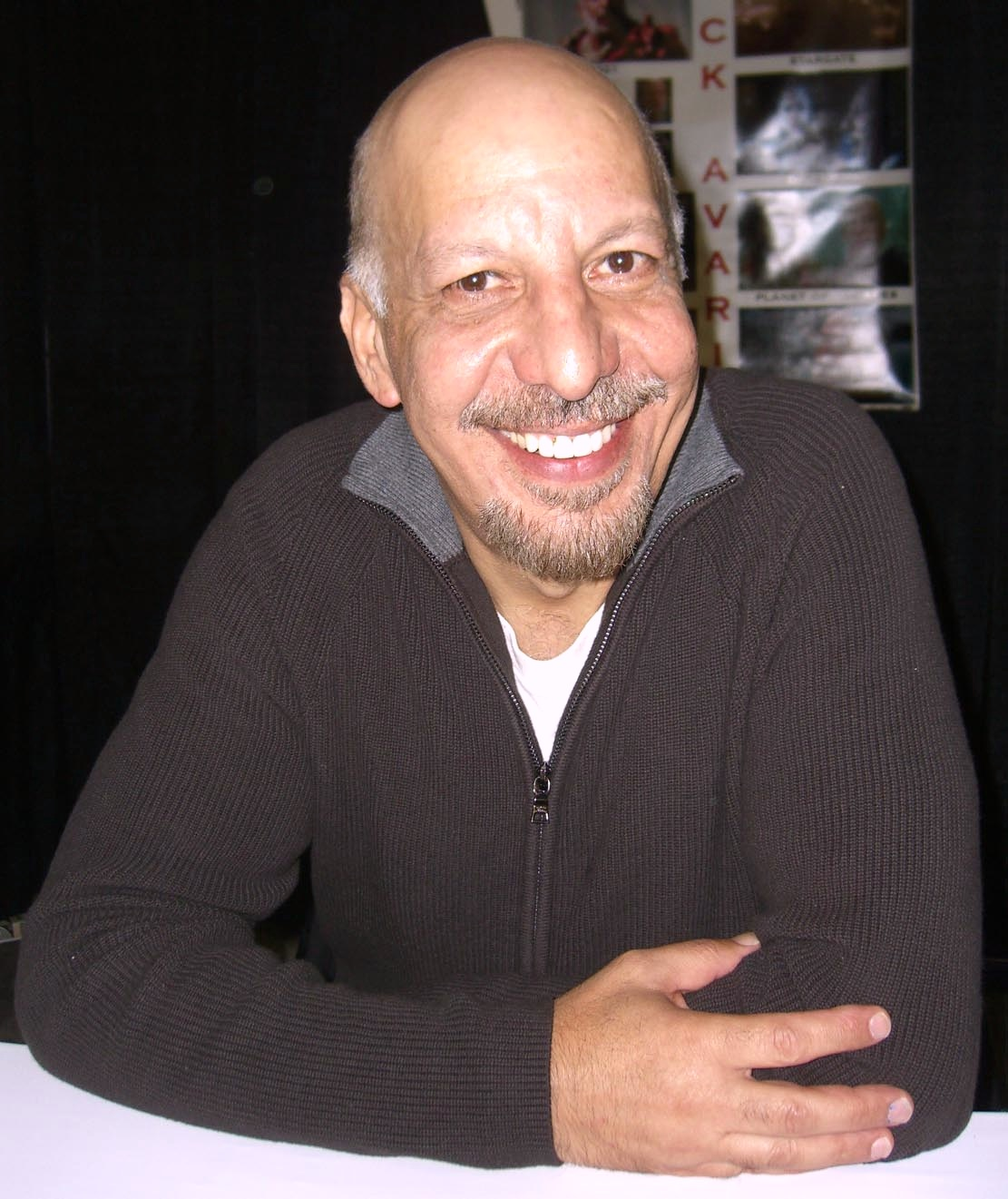
- Avari at the Big Apple Convention in Manhattan in 2009
- Born: Nariman Eruch (Erick) Avari; 13 April 1952 (age 74); Darjeeling, West Bengal, India
- Occupation: Actor
- Years active: 1962–present

Erick Avari (born Nariman Erick Avari; 13 April 1952) is an Indian-American actor whose roles in science-fiction and action productions include Stargate (1994), Independence Day (1996), and The Mummy (1999), as well as the biblical drama The Chosen (2019).

== Early life and education ==
Erick Avari was born on 13 April 1952 in Darjeeling, West Bengal, India, into a Parsi Zoroastrian family. His father, Erach Dinshaw Avari, ran two movie theatres, the Capital and the Rink.

His early education was at the North Point School, which he attended as a day-scholar. He later studied at the College of Charleston.

Avari is a member of the Avari-Madan family of Darjeeling and Calcutta. His great-great-grandfather was Jamshedji Framji Madan, one of the pioneers of Indian cinema.

== Career ==
Avari is one of only two actors, along with Alexis Cruz, to appear in both the original Stargate movie and the continuing TV series Stargate SG-1 (three episodes). Before arriving in Los Angeles in 1991, his extensive work onstage garnered him praise from theater critics across America, most notably as Vasquez, in 'Tis Pity She's a Whore with Val Kilmer at the Joseph Papp Public Theater, and as Sir Richard at The Guthrie Theater's memorable production of The Screens.

In the video game Zork Grand Inquisitor, he played Grand Inquisitor Mir Yannick, a ruthless dictator who serves as the game's main villain. He also appeared in The Librarian: Return to King Solomon's Mines.

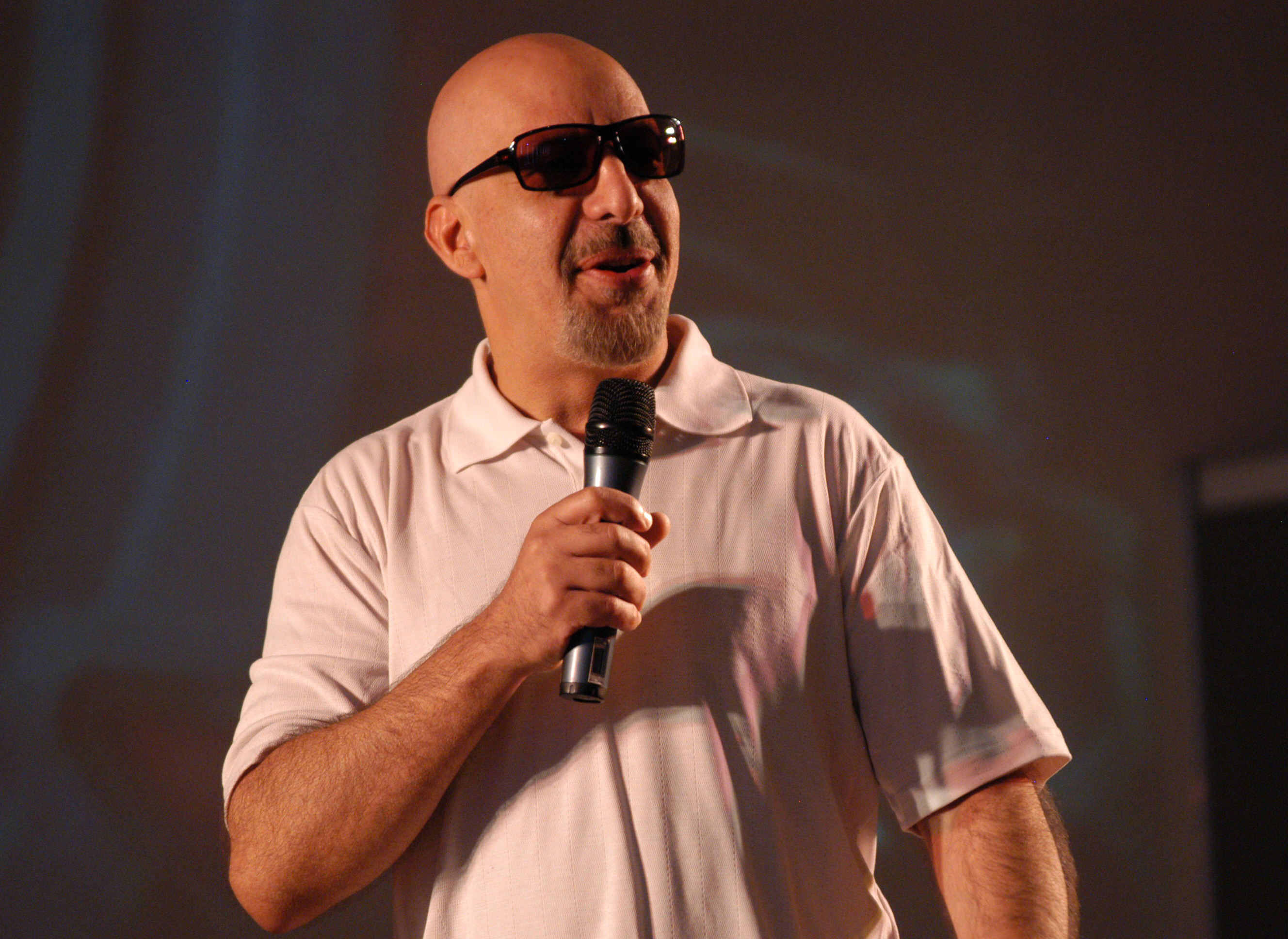
Avari in 2006

Beginning in the autumn of 2006, a photograph of Avari and a recording of his voice were used in the role of Chandra Suresh in Heroes. He did not appear onscreen until the episode "Seven Minutes to Midnight", as his character is part of the backstory and had died before the events of the pilot.

Over the course of his career, Avari has portrayed representatives of more than 24 ethnicities. As of November 2006, he has appeared in 33 feature films and over 70 television episodes.

Avari has appeared with Brent Spiner in three different productions: Star Trek: The Next Generation (1987), Independence Day (1996), and The Master of Disguise (2002). He performed opposite Richard Gere in a drama film based on a true story, Hachi: A Dog's Tale, in which he played Jasjeet, an Indian hot dog vendor. In 2001, he played Tival in Tim Burton's Planet of the Apes.

Avari was scheduled to reprise his role as Kasuf in the Stargate SG-1 Season Six finale "Full Circle", but was unable to do so due to his commitment to Dragnet (2003).

In January 2009, he played a mobile-phone salesman in Paul Blart: Mall Cop, and in October 2009, he was cast as Omar on Days of Our Lives.

In 2014, Avari voiced Master Rahool in the science fiction video game Destiny, a role he reprised in a sequel.

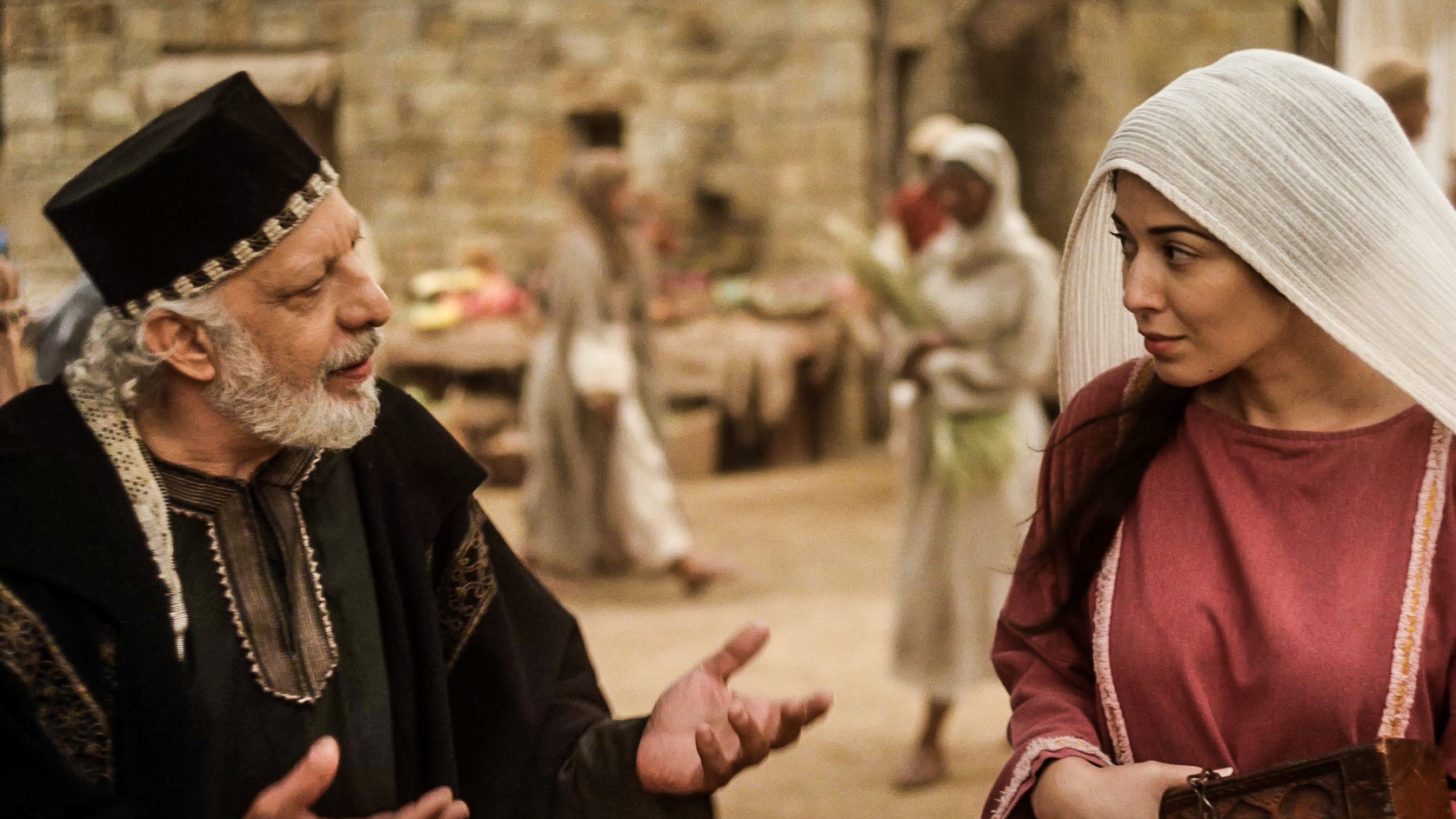
Avari as Nicodemus in The Chosen

In 2019, Avari portrayed Nicodemus in the television historical series The Chosen based on the life of Jesus Christ. He said in a 2023 interview that he considered himself retired prior to the series and mostly retired since, but may have an unspecified project in the works.

== Filmography ==
=== Film ===
Year	Title	Role	Notes
1962	Kanchenjungha	Unknown	
1984	Nothing Lasts Forever	Toulouse Lautrec	
1986	On Wings of Fire	The Professor	
1988	The Beast	Samad	
1989	She's Back	Deli Owner	
1992	Final Analysis	Moderator	Uncredited
1992	Encino Man	Raji	
1993	The Hit List	Pharmaceutical Wholesaler	
1993	For Love or Money	Benny the Jeweler	
1993	Dream Lover	Dr. Spatz	
1994	Color of Night	Cabbie	Uncredited
1994	Stargate	Kasuf	
1996	Independence Day	SETI Chief	Uncredited
1996	The Undercover Kid	Brach	
1997	McHale's Navy	European Leader	Uncredited
1999	The Mummy	Dr. Terence Bey	
1999	The 13th Warrior	Caravan Leader	Credited as Eric Avari
2001	Planet of the Apes	Tival	
2001	The Glass House	Ted Ross	
2002	Home Alone 4: Taking Back The House	Mr. Prescott (The Butler)	
2002	Three Days of Rain	Alex	
2002	Mr. Deeds	Cecil Anderson	
2002	The Master of Disguise	Cigar Maker	
2002	Ritual	Dr. Peter Winsvold	
2002	Incest	Paul	Short Film
2003	Daredevil	Nikolas Natchios	
2003	Searching for Haizmann	Father Mark Reeder	
2005	The L.A. Riot Spectacular	Matre'd	
2005	Dancing in Twilight	Matt	
2007	Dark Matter	Professor R.K. Gazda	
2007	Flight of the Living Dead: Outbreak on a Plane	Dr. Leo Bennett	
2007	Choose Connor	Arthur Dennison	
2007	Postal	Habib	
2007	Charlie Wilson's War	Ari Goldman	Uncredited
2007	InAlienable	Howard Ellis	
2008	AmericanEast	Fikry	
2009	Paul Blart: Mall Cop	Vijay	
2009	Hachi: A Dog's Tale	Jasjeet	
2010	Karma's a Bitch	Heather's Karma	Short Film
2011	Three Veils	Mr. Qasim	
2011	Where the Road Meets the Sun	Dadi	
2011	Dispatch	Sergeant Pincus	
2011	Fall North	Professor Katz	Short Film
2012	You Are the Blood	Tom	Short Film
2012	California Winter	Douglas Hariri	
2013	A Haunting at Silver Falls	Dr. Parrish	
2013	It's Not You, It's Me	Cedrick	
2015	Chasing Eagle Rock	Cam Avery	Also director, writer and producer
2017	Project Eden: Vol.I	The Shepherd	
2019	Love & Debt	Johnny	

=== Television ===
Year	Title	Role	Notes
1987	Leg Work	Sam	Episode: "Things That Go Bump in the Night"
1989	True Blue	Hakim Huzan	Episode: "Pilot: Part 1"
1990	Law & Order	Dr. Ekballa Raza	Episode: "Prescription for Death"
1991	General Hospital	Ahmed Hakeem	Unknown Episodes
1991	L.A. Law	Dr. Harris	Episode: "Splatoon"
1991	Murphy Brown	Dan	Episode: "Hoarse Play"
1991	The Antagonists	Dupree	Episode: "#1.1"
1991	Good & Evil	Dr. #2	Episode: "Pilot"
1991	Star Trek: The Next Generation	B'iJik	Episode: "Unification I"
1992	The Fresh Prince of Bel-Air	Cedric	Episode: "Ill Will"
1992	Tequila and Bonetti	Veterinarian	Episode: "Tale of the Dragon"
1992	Civil Wars	Yale Peck-Naughton	Episode: "Tape Fear"
1992	Treacherous Crossing	Don Gallegher	Television Film
1992	Dream On	Dr. Dawson	Episode: "Domestic Bliss"
1992	Wings	Artist	Episode: "Mathers of the Heart"
1992	Cheers	Mr. Cranston	Episode: "Feelings... Whoa, Whoa, Whoa"
1992	Great Scott!	Luggage Salesman	Episode: "Book Crook"
1993	Casualties of Love: The "Long Island Lolita" Story	Surgeon	Television Film
1993	Martin	Rashidi	Episode: "Jerome's in the House"
1993	Good Advice	Mr. Vajneesh	Episode: "Special Session"
1993	Seinfeld	Cabbie	Episode: "The Pilot"
1993	Scam	Mr. Ayub	Television Film
1993	seaQuest 2032	Lybyan Representative	Episode: "Treasure of the Mind"
1994	Mad About You	Dr. Arzupian	Episode: "The Last Scampi"
1994	Don't Drink the Water	Emir's Aide	Television Film
1995	Chicago Hope	Dr. Goodman	Episode: "Cutting Edges"
1995	Star Trek: Deep Space Nine	Vedek Yarka	Episode: "Destiny"
1995	VR.5	Boise	Episode: "Dr. Strangechild"
1995	Lois & Clark: The New Adventures of Superman	Mr. Moonhauer	Episode: "Target: Jimmy Olsen!"
1995	Cybill	Paolo	Episode: "Since I Lost My Baby"
1995	Aladdin on Ice	The Mystic Traveler	Television Film
1995	NYPD Blue	Rajesh	Episode: "Curt Russell"
1996	Almost Perfect	Dave	Episode: "Overly Meditated"
1996	Project: ALF	Rocket (Voice)	Television Film
1996	Murder, She Wrote	Raul Jaffa	Episode: "Mrs. Parker's Revenge"
1996	Babylon 5	Rabbi Leo Meyers	Episode: "And the Rock Cried Out, No Hiding Place"
1996	Roseanne	Prince's Assistant	Episode: "Someday My Prince Will Come"
1996	Bone Chillers	Dr. Lumbago	02 Episodes
1996	To Face Her Past	Dr. Webster	Television Film
1996	The John Larroquette Show	Targ	Episode: "Cheeses H. Taste"
1996	Mr. & Mrs. Smith	Hissene Idriss	Episode: "The Bob Episode"
1997	Gun	The Proprietor	Episode: "The Shot"
1997	Baywatch Nights	Dr. Kasan	Episode: "The Servant"
1997	Profiler	Ashok Dupree	Episode: "Ambition in Blood"
1997	The Tom Show	Lloyd	Episode: "The White Shadow"
1998	JAG	Minister Nassan	Episode: "The Black Jet"
1998–2001	Stargate SG-1	Kasuf	3 Episodes
1999	Family Law	Unknown	Episode: "Games"
1999–2000	The Wild Thornberrys	Various (Voices)	3 Episodes
2000	The West Wing	Pakistani Ambassador	Episode: "Lord John Marbury"
2001	Cousin Skeeter	Unknown	Episode: "Bellboyz in the Hood"
2001	The Education of Max Bickford	McKenney Dawes	Episode: "Pilot"
2001	Thieves	Benny Mustafa	Episode: "Dey Got De Degas"
2001	Star Trek: Enterprise	Jamin	Episode: "Terra Nova"
2001	The X-Files	Dr. Herb Fountain	Episode: "Lord of the Flies"
2001	Felicity	Dr. Ansari	2 Episodes
2002	The District	Omar Khalid	Episode: "Twist of Hate"
2002	Dharma & Greg	Lalit	Episode: "I Think, Therefore I Am in Trouble"
2002	Home Alone 4: Taking Back the House	Mr. Prescott	Television Film
2003	Everwood	James Gellar	Episode: "Extra Ordinary"
2003	L.A. Dragnet	Sanjay Ramachandran	9 Episodes
2003	Law & Order	Ravi Patel	Episode: "Floater"
2003	Alias	Dr. Vasson	Episode: "Breaking Point"
2003	NCIS	Agent William Gamal	Episode: "Minimum Security"
2004	Judging Amy	Steven Nashte	Episode: "Catching It Early"
2005	JAG	Sheik Shuhaib Al-Hassan	Episode: "Bridging the Gulf"
2005	Tru Calling	Dr. Thomas Burell	Episode: "Grace"
2005	Hope & Faith	Hassan	Episode: "Christmas Time"
2006	The O.C.	Dr. Overbee	Episode: "The College Try"
2006	The Librarian: Return to King Solomon's Mines	General Samir	Television Film
2006	Heroes	Chandra Suresh	4 Episodes
2007	Law & Order: Criminal Intent	Kazi Hasni	Episode: "World's Fair"
2007	Dirty Sexy Money	Harold Templeton	Episode: "The Chiavennasca"
2007	The Rich Inner Life of Penelope Cloud	Dr. Albert Hakim	Television Film
2008	The Middleman	Lord Jeremiah Purcell	Episode: "The Obsolescent Cryogenic Meltdown"
2008	Burn Notice	Nefzi	2 Episodes
2008	The Sarah Silverman Program	Alex Gilbert	Episode: "Patriot Tact"
2008	The Madness of Jane	Norman Divitry	Television Film
2009	Leverage	Doctor Lloyd	Episode: "The Second David Job"
2009	Life	Edward Zakaria	Episode: "Hit Me Baby"
2009	Mental	Dr. Timothy Paul	Episode: "House of Mirrors"
2009	Hung	Therapist	Episode: "Doris Is Dead or Are We Rich or Are We Poor?"
2009	Days of Our Lives	Omar	8 Episodes
2010	Castle	Rupert Bentley	Episode: "Wrapped Up in Death"
2010	Human Target	Gerard	Episode: "Victoria"
2010	Party Down	Reverend	Episode: "Constance Carmell Wedding"
2010	Lie to Me	Dr. Kozell	Episode: "Pied Piper"
2011, 2014	Warehouse 13	Caturanga	3 Episodes
2012	NCIS: Los Angeles	Hosein Khadem	Episode: "Endgame"
2012	Parenthood	Leon Dengraff	Episode: "There's Something I Need to Tell You..."
2012	Covert Affairs	Omar Ansari	Episode: "Quicksand"
2013	The Mentalist	Lance Reinhardt	Episode: "Red Lacquer Nail Polish"
Major Crimes	Ravi Madhavan	Episode: "Do Not Disturb"	
Scorpion	Robert Richter	Episode: "Single Point of Failure"	
Grimm	JP	Episode: "Highway of Tears"	
Hieroglyph	Odion	Television Film	
2015	Madam Secretary	Turkish Foreign Minister Ozan Canoglu	Episode: "The Ninth Circle"
2015	The Brink	Hasan	7 Episodes
2017	Graves	Ahsan	Episode: "They Die Happier"
2019, 2025	The Chosen	Nicodemus	10 Episodes

=== Video games ===
Year	Title	Role	Notes
1997	Zork: Grand Inquisitor	Grand Inquisitor Mir Yannick	Voice
2014	Destiny	Master Rahool	Voice
2017	Destiny 2	Master Rahool	Voice

== See also ==
- J. J. Madan
