= Rooftop Films =

American nonprofit organization

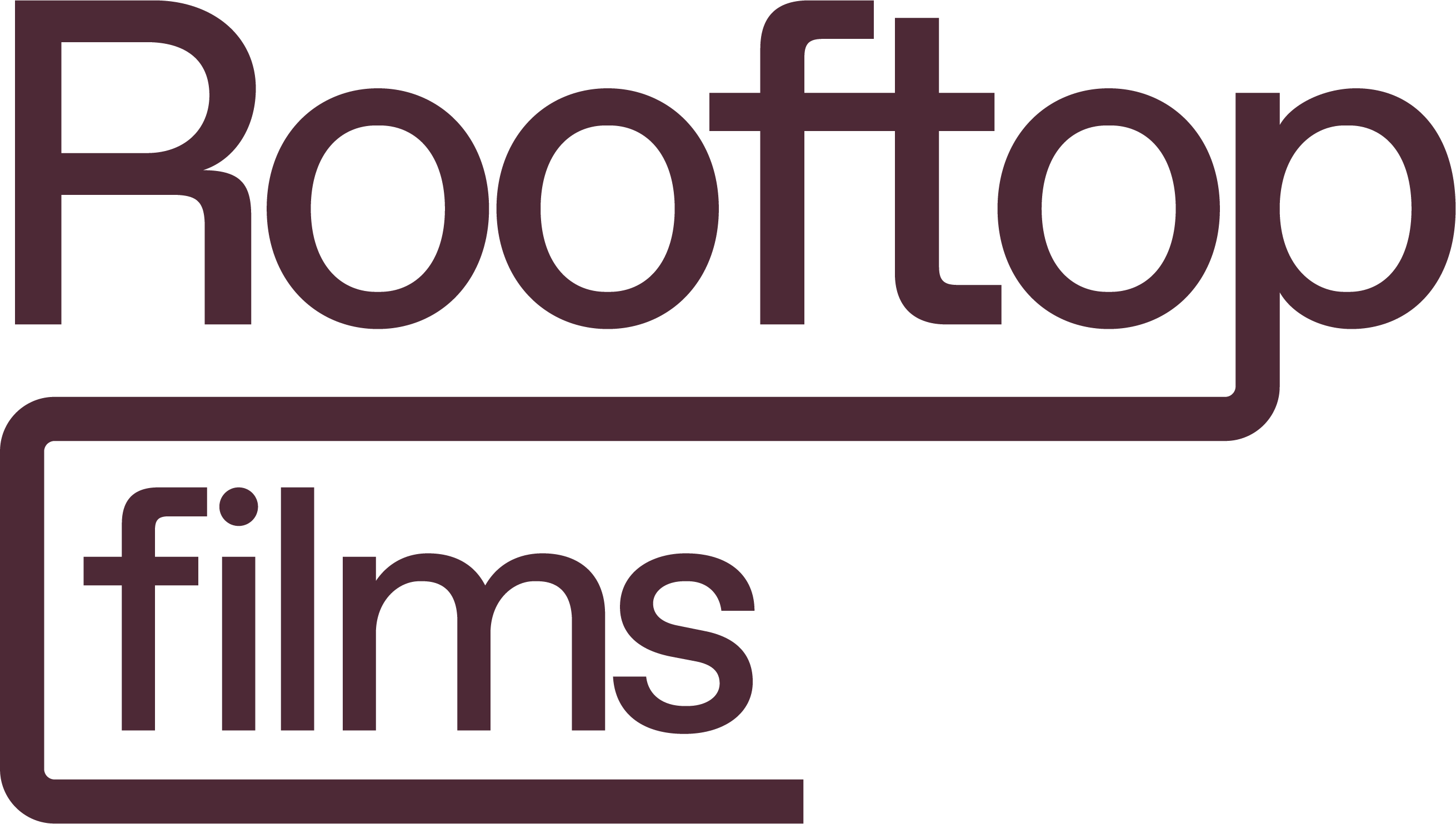
- Formation: 1997; 29 years ago
- Website: rooftopfilms.com

Rooftop Films is a non-profit film organization based in Gowanus, Brooklyn. It is best known for its Rooftop Films Summer Series, a film festival that runs from May through August every year, and consists of as many as 47 outdoor screenings of new independent short and feature-length films. Rooftop screenings all take place on rooftops or in other outdoor locations throughout New York City. Rooftop also offers film and video equipment rentals throughout the year, as well as grants which help finance new independent film projects.

== History ==
Founded by Mark Elijah Rosenberg in 1997, the festival included one night of short film screenings in each of its first two years. Rooftop moved in 1998 to the roof of Peter's Car Corp. a 10,000-square-foot (930 m^{2}) artists' loft and occasional event space located at 265 McKibbin Street. An all-volunteer staff that included Rosenberg, Joshua Breitbart and Moira Griffin helped Rooftop expand from one screening a summer to more than 12 a summer by 2002. In 2003, Rosenberg became Rooftop's first full-time employee as Artistic Director, while former volunteers Dan Nuxoll and Sarah Palmer became part-time employees as the Program Director and Festival Director, respectively. That year, Rooftop moved its offices and event space a few blocks down the street to Office Ops. Daisy Rosario served as festival producer from 2007 until 2011.

== Growth ==
In winter 2004 Rooftop moved their offices to The Old American Can Factory in Gowanus Brooklyn. In 2007, the staff expanded to include Managing Director Genevieve DeLaurier, and now also includes Will Chu (Technical Manager), Danielle Kourtesis (Music Coordinator), Kristin Molloy (Festival Manager Manager), and dozens of other seasonal employees. In 2020, Nadine Goellner was hired as executive director. The Board of Directors includes: Vinay Singh, Jason Ward, Brent Green, Evan List, Casimir Nozkowski (Secretary), Teresa Lee (Vice-Chair and Treasurer), Evan List, Ryan Smith, Anne Hubbell, Danielle DiGiacomo, (Treasurer), and Mark Elijah Rosenberg, and Jess Jacobs (Chair). The Board Advisors include: Joshua Breitbart and Philip Rosenberg. The Panorama Advisors include: J. Tad Barnes, Amy Dotson, Lucila Moctezuma, Josh Penn, Molly Thompson, and Nicole Tschampel.

== Summer Series ==
Rooftop Films is best known for its Summer Series. With an audience of over 30,000 each summer, the Summer Series has become one of the best-attended film events in the United States. Screened films often include world premieres and festival award-winners. Admission to a screening is almost always $13 or less, and screenings are often followed by open bar after-parties.

Summer Series events take place at a wide variety of outdoor venues including the roof of the Old American Can Factory in Gowanus, Open Road Rooftop on the Lower East Side, the lawn at Automotive High School in Williamsburg, the roof of El Museo del Barrio, the roof of Brooklyn Technical High School in Fort Greene, and more. Past venues have included Governors Island, the roof of Westbeth Artists Community, Fort Greene Park, 210 Cook Street in Bushwick, Solar One on East 23rd Street, a roof within the Brooklyn Navy Yard, Soutpoint Park on Roosevelt Island, and many other spots across the city.

== Musical acts ==
Live music precedes almost every Rooftop screening, with many established and up and coming performers appearing each year. Past musical acts include TV on the Radio, The Bravery, Sharon Van Etten, Jose Gonzales, The Mountain Goats, Julianna Barwick, Titus Andronicus, Phosphorescent, The Antlers, Teengirl Fantasy, Mutual Benefit, members of Fugazi and Califone, Vic Thrill, Dirty on Purpose, O'Death, and many others.

== Filmmakers' Fund ==
Rooftop has enabled the success of many of its alumni through its Filmmakers’ Fund Grants, which provides production or post-production support to independent filmmakers. Rooftop earmarks a portion of all ticket sales and submission fees to its Filmmaker's Fund Grant program. Filmmakers' Fund Grants have supported award-winnings films such as Beasts of the Southern Wild, Martha Marcy May Marlene, Ain’t Them Bodies Saints, and The Tsunami and the Cherry Blossom.

== Equipment Rentals ==
Rooftop makes all its film/video exhibition equipment available for low-cost rentals. Projectors, sound systems, screens and more are available, including its 40-foot wide inflatable airscreen.
