= FEST New Directors New Films Festival =

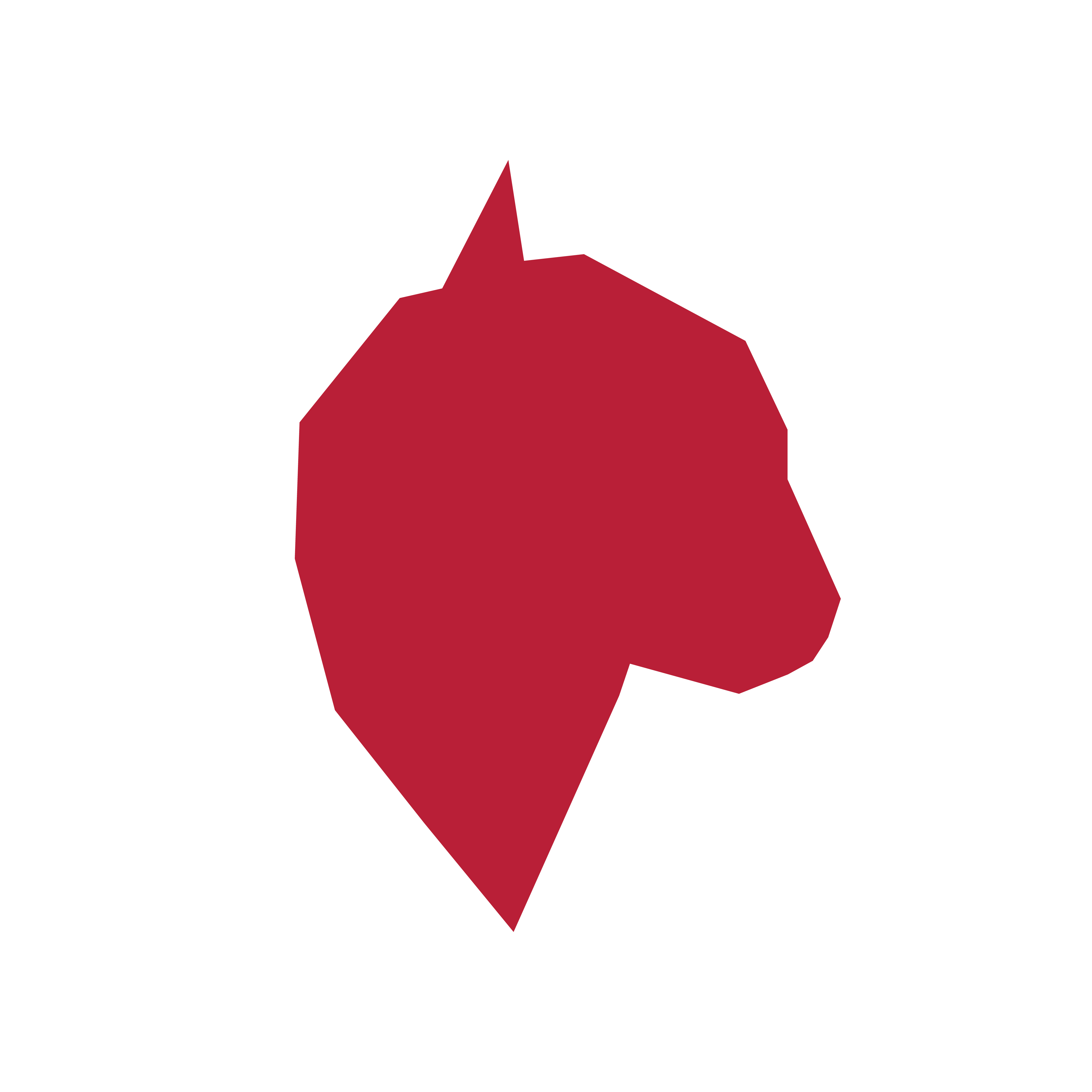
The Lynx is the symbol of FEST - NDNFF in Espinho

FEST — New Directors | New Films Festival is a film festival and training event which occurs annually in the city of Espinho, Portugal. FEST has the purpose of "promoting the work of new directors from all over the world". Parallel to the film competition, there is Training Ground, an educational event for young filmmakers. The speakers are top experts with recognized achievements.

== History ==
New Directors | New Films Festival, was founded in 2004, as FEST – Youth Video and Film Festival. It was born out of the necessity to create a space where new and up-and-coming filmmakers could screen their work. Among many other objectives was the will to promote already established names alongside new one, in order to open new paths for new talents to break through. The year 2005 marked the beginning of the Film Students Encounter, the event that would later be developed and renamed Training Ground.

Training Ground had its first official date in 2009. In that year Tom Stern (cinematographer of Million Dollar Baby and Gran Torino) and Álex Rodríguez (film editor of Y Tu Mamá También and Children of Men) were among the speakers. This first edition had a total of 160 young filmmakers from 25 different countries. In 2013, the festival was renamed FEST New Directors | New Films Festival.

== Training Ground ==
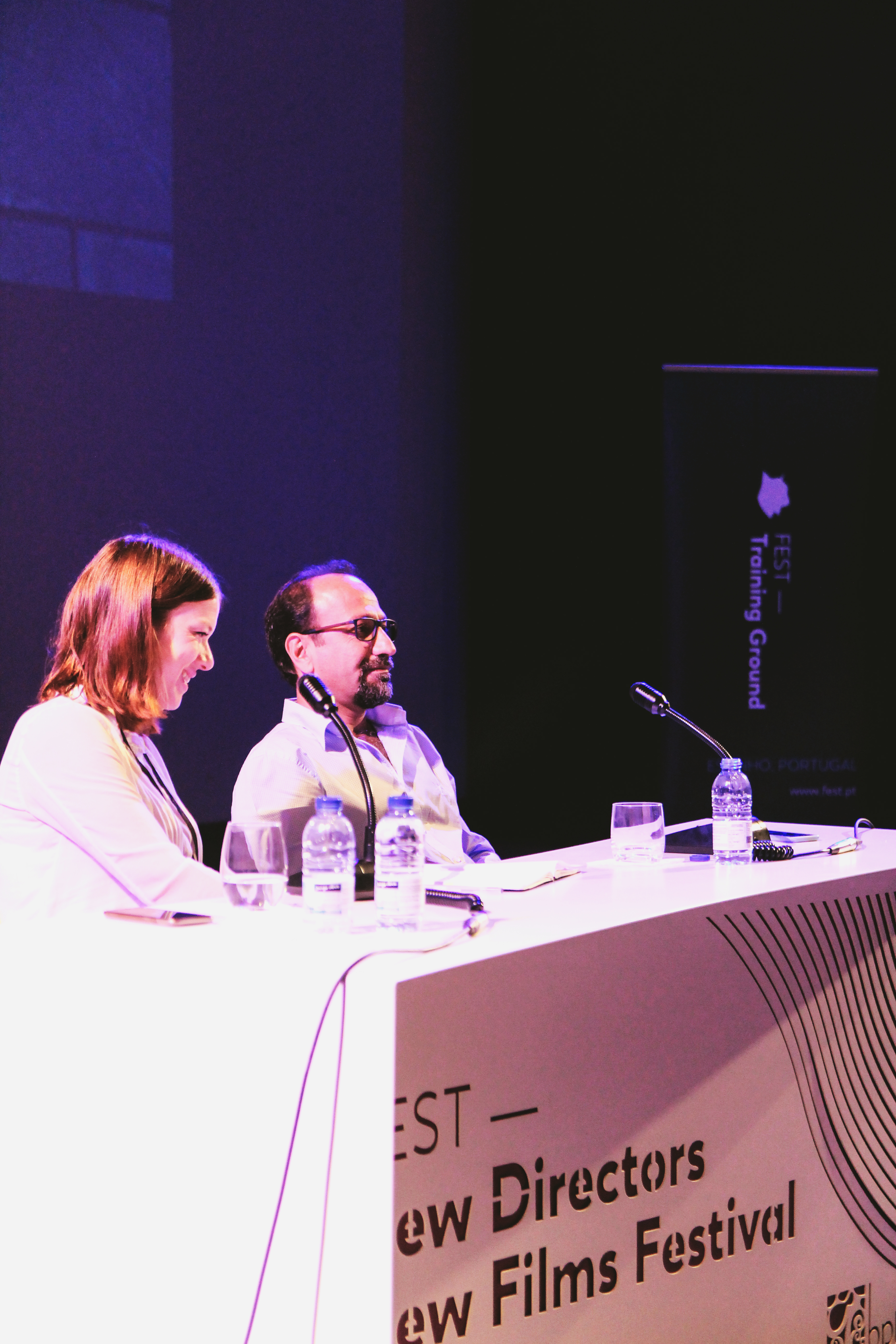
Asghar Farhadi and Franziska Hoenisch at FEST - Training Ground 2018

Training Ground is an educational event that takes place alongside the film festival. It welcomes internacional film experts who share knowledge about their craft, as well hundreds of film students from all over the world, who come together for a week-long learning experience.

Since its beginning in 2009, Training Ground's speakers list has included: Melissa Leo (Frozen River, The Fighter), Peter Webber (Girl with a Pearl Earring, Hannibal Rising), Christian Berger (The Piano Teacher, The White Ribbon), Tariq Anwar (American Beauty, The King's Speech), Fernando Trueba (Belle Époque, Chico and Rita), Tom Stern (Million Dollar Baby, Gran Torino), Martin Walsh (Chicago, Wonder Woman), Laurence Bennett (Crash, The Artist), Eugenio Caballero (Pan's Labyrinth, The Impossible), Álex Rodríguez (Y Tu Mamá También, Children of Men), Larry Smith (Eyes Wide Shut, Only God Forgives), Kjartan Sveinsson (Vanilla Sky, 127 Hours), and David Macmillan (The Right Stuff, Apollo 13). Training Ground is dedicated to all film production areas from editing, sound editing, production design, music, cinematography, screenwriting, directing, acting, among others. It is made up of an intensive week of masterclasses, workshops and other events.
