= Send In Stewie, Please =

- Family Guy episode
- Stewie (right) speaking to his child psychologist Dr. Cecil Pritchfield (left)
- Episode no.: Season 16; Episode 12
- Directed by: Joe Vaux
- Written by: Gary Janetti
- Production code: FACX10
- Original air date: March 18, 2018
- Running time: 25 minutes

Guest appearance
- Ian McKellen as Dr. Cecil Pritchfield

Episode chronology
← Previous "Dog Bites Bear"	Next → "V Is for Mystery"
- Family Guy season 16

"Send In Stewie, Please" is the twelfth episode of the sixteenth season of the animated sitcom Family Guy and the 301st episode overall. It aired on Fox in the United States on March 18, 2018. Written by Gary Janetti and directed by Joe Vaux, the episode features guest star Ian McKellen as Dr. Cecil Pritchfield, a child psychologist who conducts a therapy session with Stewie Griffin following an incident at his preschool. During the session, Stewie discusses his personal secrets, including his sexuality, loneliness, alienation from others, as well as his fabricated British accent.

The episode received polarizing reviews from critics, who have retrospectively ranked it among both the series' best and worst episodes. The episode was watched by 2.24 million viewers during its original broadcast, and received a Nielsen rating of 1.0 among adults aged 18–49. For their work on the episode, Seth MacFarlane was nominated for the Primetime Emmy Award for Outstanding Character Voice-Over Performance, and Janetti was nominated for the Writers Guild of America Award for Television: Animation.

== Plot ==
At Quahog Preschool, Stewie is sent to the office of Dr. Cecil Pritchfield, a child psychologist. Stewie begins the therapy session by making observational small talk. He then starts to talk proudly about his British accent, but the psychologist says that he cannot hear it, much to Stewie's annoyance.

When the doctor tells him he feels he knows him a bit after only a few minutes in his company, Stewie picks up a photograph of him on vacation with his husband Michael. Stewie begins to analyze their relationship in remarkable detail, revealing Pritchfield's embarrassment and insecurity about being much older than his husband. The psychologist then observes that Stewie is very lonely, at which Stewie suddenly bursts into tears, as Pritchfield's aide Barbara hands him some tissues.

After Stewie regains composure, Pritchfield mentions the incident that brought Stewie to his office, in which he pushed a classmate, Tyler, down the stairs. Stewie protests that he only did it because he liked Tyler and was afraid he would not like him back. Stewie denies being gay and declares that he is "confident" in his heterosexuality. He also expresses his difficulty fitting in when none of the other boys share his interests in musicals and world domination. He admits to pulling out his own hair because of anxiety, and expresses frustration at not being able to be on Broadway. He then performs to Pritchfield part of a "number" from the musical Hamilton, while fighting hiccups and a runny nose.

Stewie takes up an offer of tea and Pritchfield begins to tell him of his own youth as an orphan in Britain during the Second World War. Stewie interrupts his long story and they return to discussing Stewie's differences and difficulty fitting in. Stewie admits that he has constructed a persona in order to hide his true self, and drops his British accent, revealing his true accent to have been American all along. He makes plans to reveal his true self to others as well, but reconsiders and reverts to his British accent when he faces being just like everyone else.

Suddenly, Pritchfield starts to have a heart attack and asks Stewie to hand him his heart medication. But Stewie, aware that Pritchfield is the only one who has seen through his façade, decides to let him die, even as Pritchfield warns that his death will haunt him. Pritchfield calls out to Barbara, but Stewie points out that she has already gone to lunch. Pritchfield picks up the photo of himself with Michael and recites lines from Romeo and Juliet as he dies in front of Stewie. Shortly afterwards, Michael, unaware of Pritchfield's death, leaves a voicemail demanding a divorce.

Later that night, Stewie wakes up screaming, plagued by guilt over his actions as Pritchfield had warned, and asks Brian to sleep in his bed with him. He mentions that he has done something awful, though he does not explain it further. As Brian falls asleep, Stewie lies awake, disturbed and unsure whether his experience with Pritchfield was real or just a dream.

== Production ==
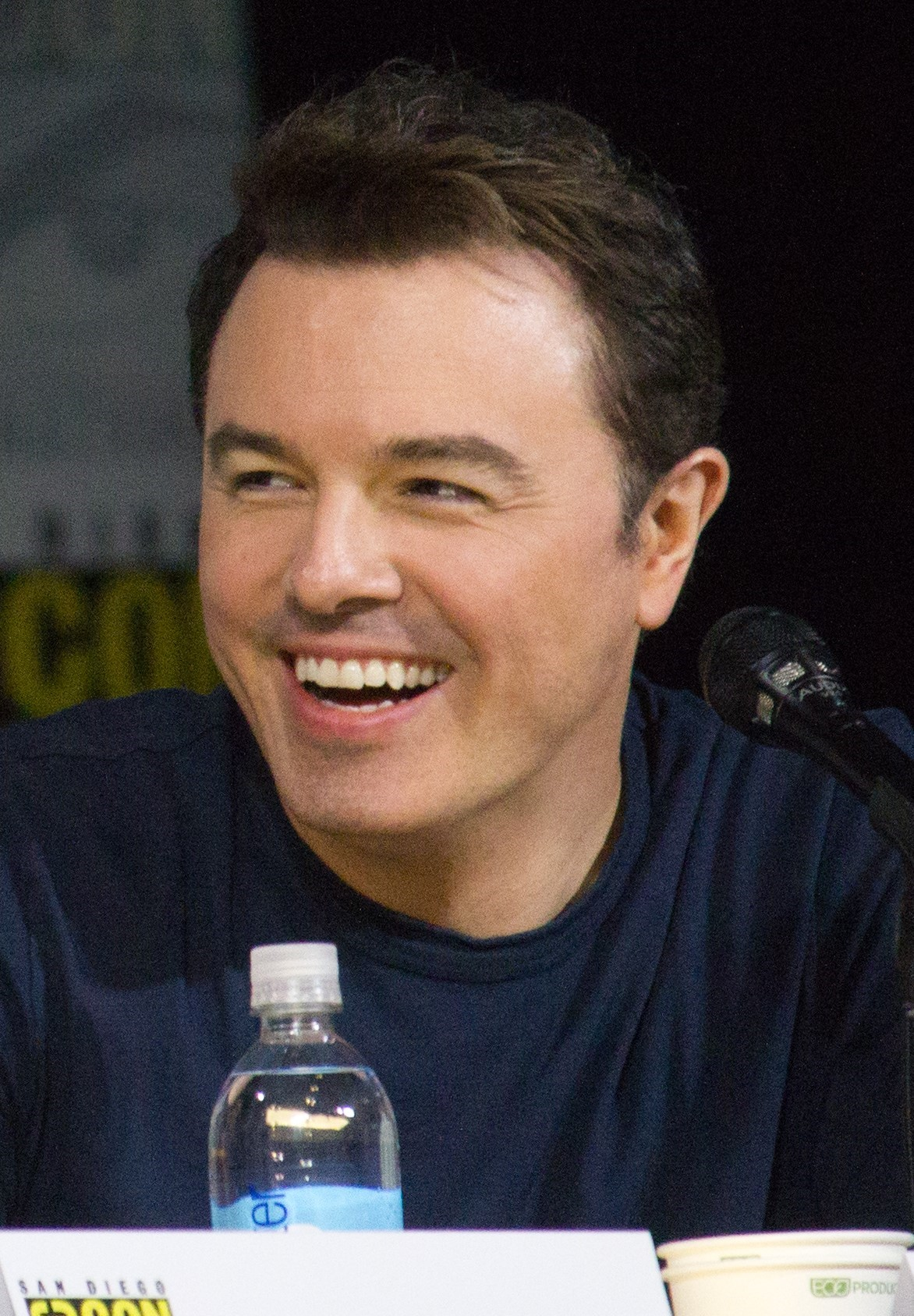
Seth MacFarlane (pictured in 2017)

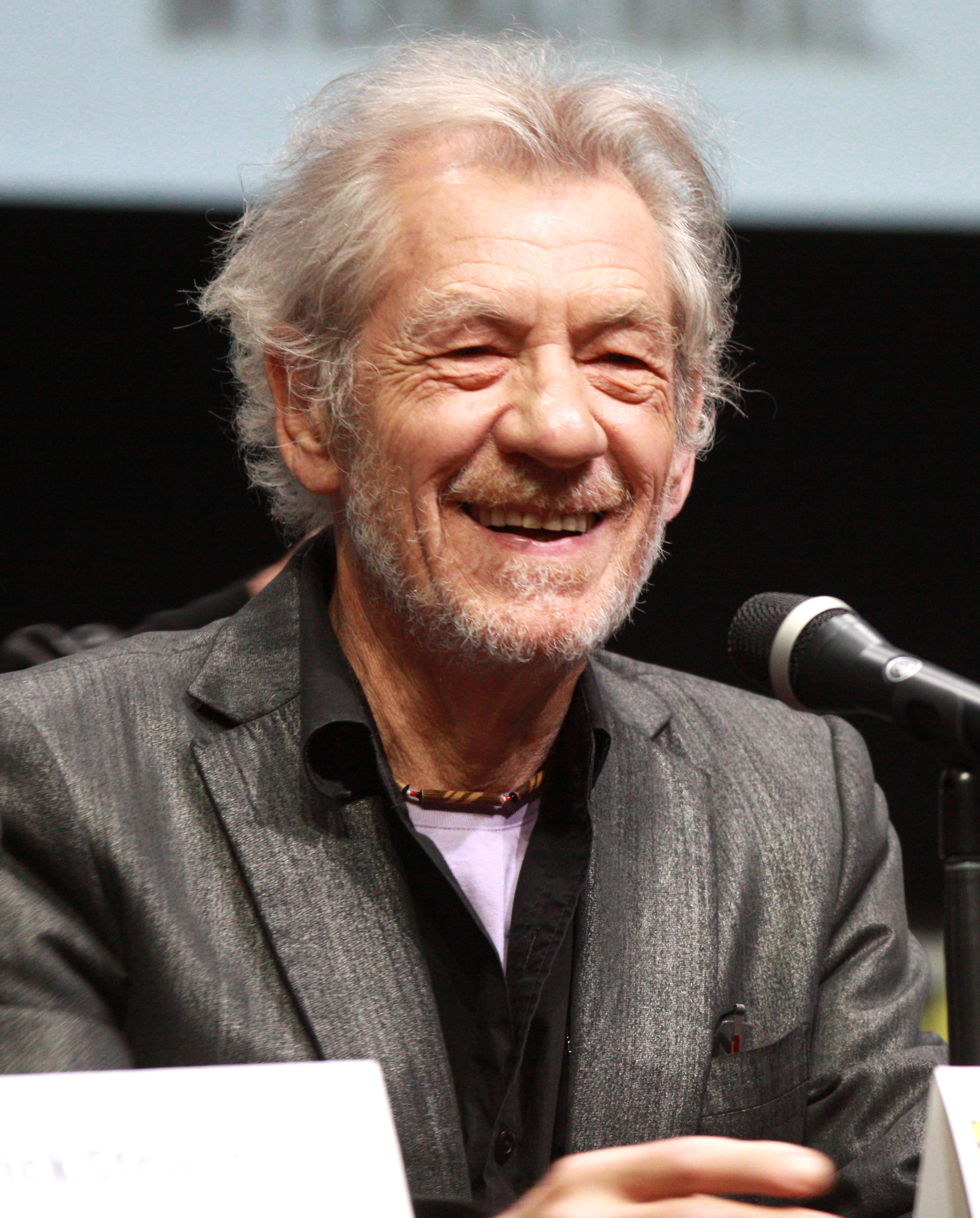
Ian McKellen (pictured in 2013)

"Send In Stewie, Please" was first announced by Fox during Day 1 of the TCA winter press tour in Pasadena, California on January 4, 2018. The episode was written by Gary Janetti, a veteran Family Guy writer who had specialized in episodes centered around Stewie and Brian Griffin since the show's first season. Janetti pitched the episode's script as a freelancer, having long wanted to write an extended monologue for Stewie, but never finding an appropriate place to add one. He found the opportunity while writing the episode as a therapy session, commenting that Stewie's five-and-a-half minute monologue "ended up being longer than even I intended."

For the role of Dr. Cecil Pritchfield, Janetti wrote the part with Ian McKellen in mind—describing him as a "formidable adversary" for Stewie—after his previous casting in the British sitcom Vicious, in which Janetti served as co-creator. When Janetti asked McKellen about the role, McKellen replied, "I'd love to do it! I love Stewie!" McKellen, an openly gay actor and prominent LGBT rights activist, previously came out in 1988.

Janetti linked Stewie's fake British accent to Stewie's broader insecurities, explaining that "it felt truthful that somebody who didn't feel like he fit in would create an artificial personality." Stewie's performance of "Alexander Hamilton" from the musical Hamilton was scripted only as him fighting a runny nose during the song, but Janetti credited director Joe Vaux with adding emotion and suspense to the scene, and for "taking a simple stage direction and turning it into a tour de force presentation."

Following its announcement, Fox advertised "Send In Stewie, Please" as Family Guy's first "limited-commercial-interruption" episode, with a runtime of 25 minutes. The format was decided after a successful table read—after which the writers would usually trim content—where Fox executive Jonathan Gabay asked "Gee, how do you cut this down?" and suggested the episode run commercial-free. Fox chairman Gary Newman ultimately approved the decision, stating, "We'll do this with or without a sponsor." PlayStation became the episode's sole sponsor, running a 60-second promotion for God of War before and after the episode.

== Reception ==
"Send In Stewie, Please" received polarizing reviews from critics, who have ranked it among both Family Guy's best and worst episodes. The episode was originally slated to air on March 11, 2018, though it ultimately aired a week later on March 18. The episode's original American broadcast was watched by 2.24 million viewers and received a Nielsen rating of 1.0, with a 4 share, in the 18–49 demographics.

In an advance review, Kevin Fallon of The Daily Beast called the episode one of Family Guy's "best [...] in a very long time" and "one of the most nuanced and edgy coming out episodes of a TV show", noting Stewie's sexuality is ultimately left ambiguous. Steve Greene of IndieWire gave the episode a "B-" grade, highlighting the bottle episode format and the lack of cutaway gags, though he believed Stewie's American accent reveal lacked significance in a series with "the ever-present need for a hard reset at the end of the episode."

In retrospective reviews, Padraig Cotter of Screen Rant called it the series' "darkest" episode—singling out its ending—and praised MacFarlane and McKellen's voice work, while Billy Fellows of Collider named it Family Guy's "best-written episode" for its dialogue and character-driven narrative. Michael Boyle of /Film ranked it among the show's five worst, describing it as a "far less successful" spiritual successor to the earlier episode "Brian & Stewie".

Seth MacFarlane was nominated for Outstanding Character Voice-Over Performance at the 70th Primetime Creative Arts Emmy Awards in September 2018 for his performance as Stewie and Brian in this episode, though lost to his Family Guy co-star Alex Borstein for the episode "Nanny Goats". The following February, episode writer Gary Janetti was nominated for Outstanding Writing in Animation at the 71st Writers Guild of America Awards, losing to Stephanie Gillis for her work on The Simpsons' episode "Bart's Not Dead".

=== Stewie's homosexuality ===
We had an episode that went all the way to the script phase in which Stewie does come out. It had to do with the harassment he took from other kids at school. He ends up going back in time to prevent a passage in Leviticus from being written: "Thou shalt not lie with mankind as with womankind. It is an abomination."

But we decided it's better to keep it vague, which makes more sense because he's a 1-year-old. Ultimately, Stewie will be gay or a very unhappy repressed heterosexual.

— Seth MacFarlane in an interview for Playboy's September 2009 issue

Stewie's ambiguous sexuality had not been explicitly acknowledged in the show prior to the episode's airing. Seth MacFarlane had previously discussed the topic during multiple interviews, including a January 2008 interview with The Advocate, stating he and the Family Guy writers "feel that Stewie is almost certainly gay", and in an interview for Playboy in September 2009 where he discusses an unproduced script where Stewie would come out of the closet. Later, in February 2013, MacFarlane made a tweet rejecting a definitive answer, stating "Just FYI, Stewie's not gay. We haven't decided what he is."

The episode marked the first time the series confronted Stewie's sexuality directly, though Stewie ultimately denies being gay, and felt "less gay than [he] used to be," professing a fluid heterosexuality, so that his orientation is again left unresolved. The episode's writer, Gary Janetti, stated the intention was for Stewie "never to come out as gay or not gay", and that "whether he is [gay] or not, that isn't going to be answered when he's a one-year-old." MacFarlane similarly felt Stewie's sexuality was best left "not determined yet" as a baby.
