= 2009 in red carpet fashion =

Red carpet fashion in 2009 featured unusually extravagant couture looks at the Golden Globes, asymmetrical one-shouldered gowns in neutral or jewel tones at the Oscars, and bright, relatively understated styles at the Emmys.

== Golden Globe Awards (January 15) ==
After the cancellation of the 2008 event due to the 2007-08 writer's strike, plus the risk that a threatened actor's strike would imperil the Oscars, and a star-studded presidential inauguration scheduled 5 days after, the 66th Golden Globe Awards were more glamorous than usual, with many stars choosing unique couture gowns that might normally have been reserved for the Oscars.

InStyle ranked Eva Mendes's strapless white Dior dress as the 4th best dress of the decade. This dress was very widely praised at the time, and continued to be remembered through the early 2010s as a particularly notable design which foreshadowed trends for winter white by several years. In 2015, Mendes's 2009 appearance was still being held up as one of the great Golden Globe red carpet looks. In 2013, whilst Hello! noted other dresses from this event (such as Cameron Diaz's pink satin Chanel and Kate Winslet's black Yves Saint Laurent gown) as among the 20 best ever Golden Globes dresses, Mendes was prominently placed on the list.

== Academy Awards (February 22) ==
For the 81st Academy Awards neutral-coloured dresses in asymmetrical and either full-skirted or mermaid styles were widely worn. The New York Times commented that despite the safeness of Oscar fashions, the 2009 looks seemed "less branded," with more focus on statement jewelry (such as Amy Adams's necklace) than on designer labels. Vogue observed that alongside strapless dresses, one of the season's big trends for one-shouldered designs was reflected on the red carpet in gowns worn by Freida Pinto, Marisa Tomei, and that year's Best Actress winner, Kate Winslet, whose violet-grey satin and black lace Yves Saint Laurent gown was placed at number 8 in the InStyle list of 100 best dresses of the decade. Anne Hathaway's jewelled mermaid dress by Armani Privé led to Cosmopolitan declaring that she would make "headlines as “Best Dressed”", and was compared to a "burst of light underneath her" by InStyle, who placed it 2nd in their list of the 100 best dresses of the decade. Styled by Rachel Zoe, the Armani dress has been called one of Hathaway's style 'highs.' Vogue also noted that despite the popularity of nude tones, a number of women wore jewel tones in reds, purples and blues, although other commentators focused on the neutral-tone dresses.

=== Gallery ===
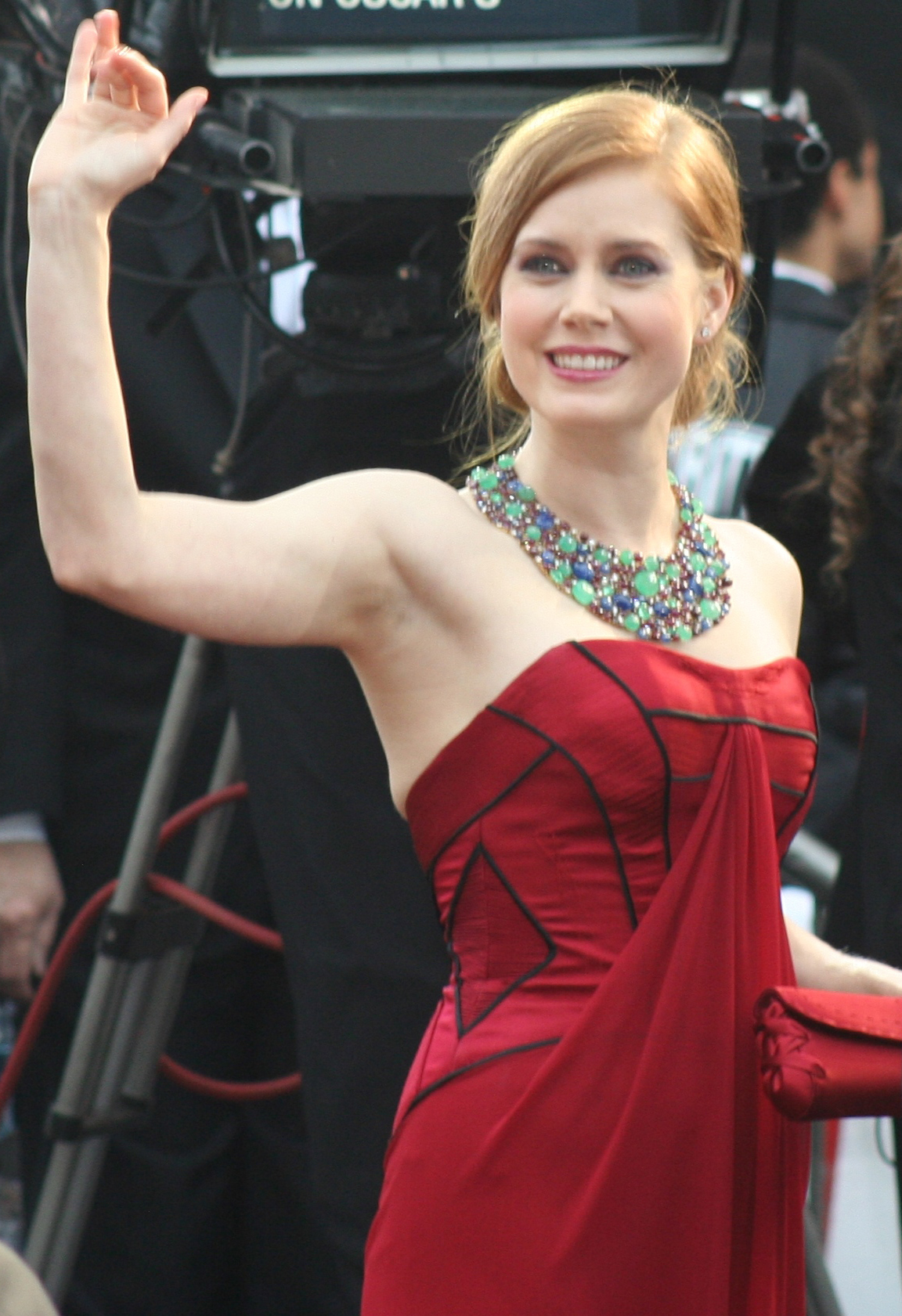
Amy Adams in a ruby red gown and bold necklace

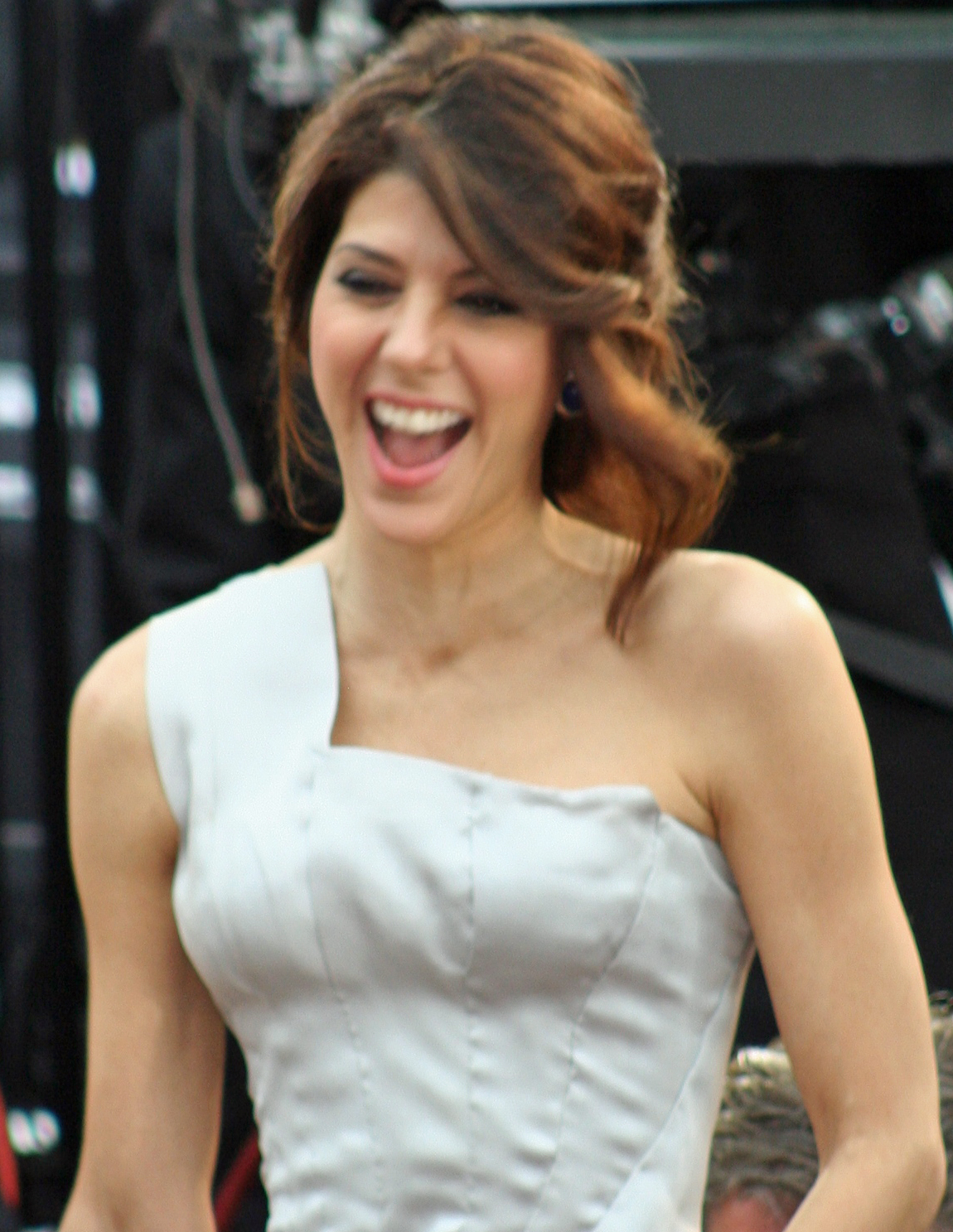
Marisa Tomei in a one-shouldered neutral gown

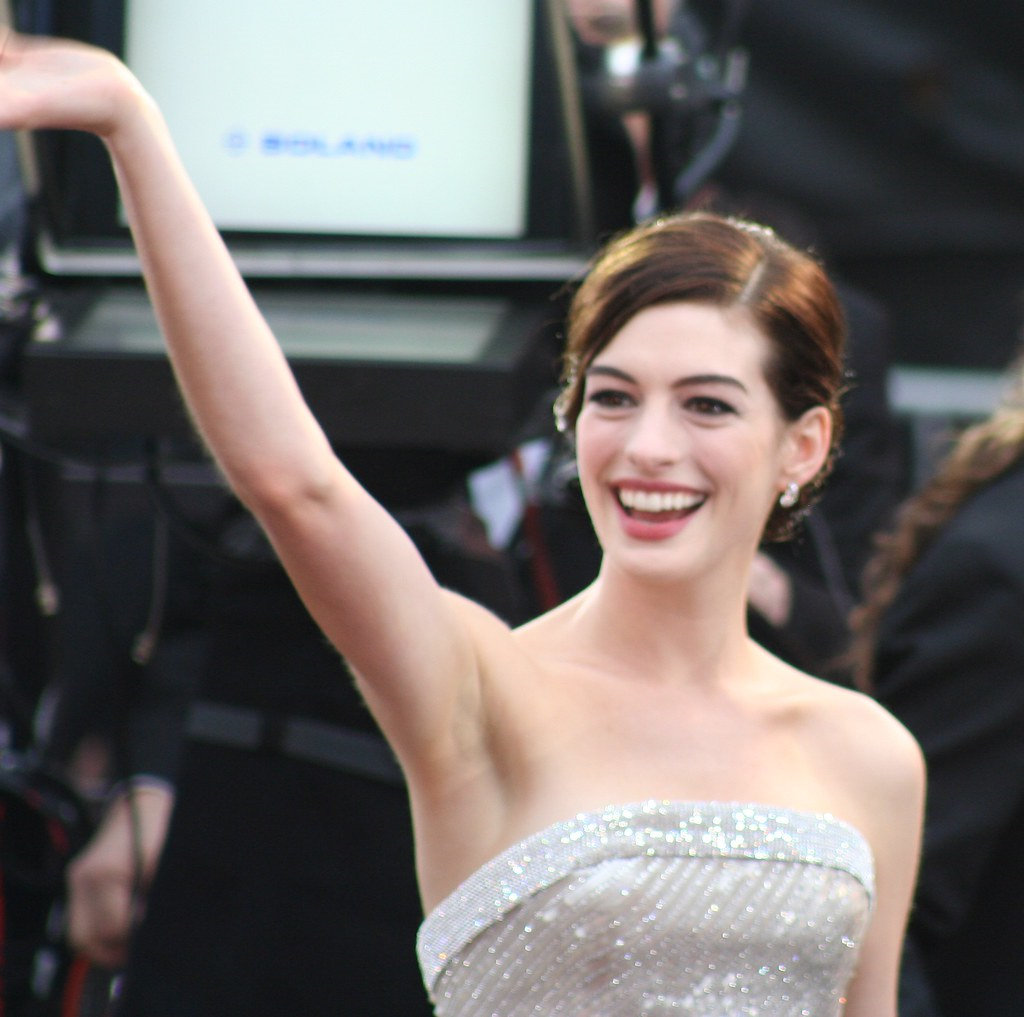
Anne Hathaway in strapless Armani Privé gown

== Emmys (September 20) ==
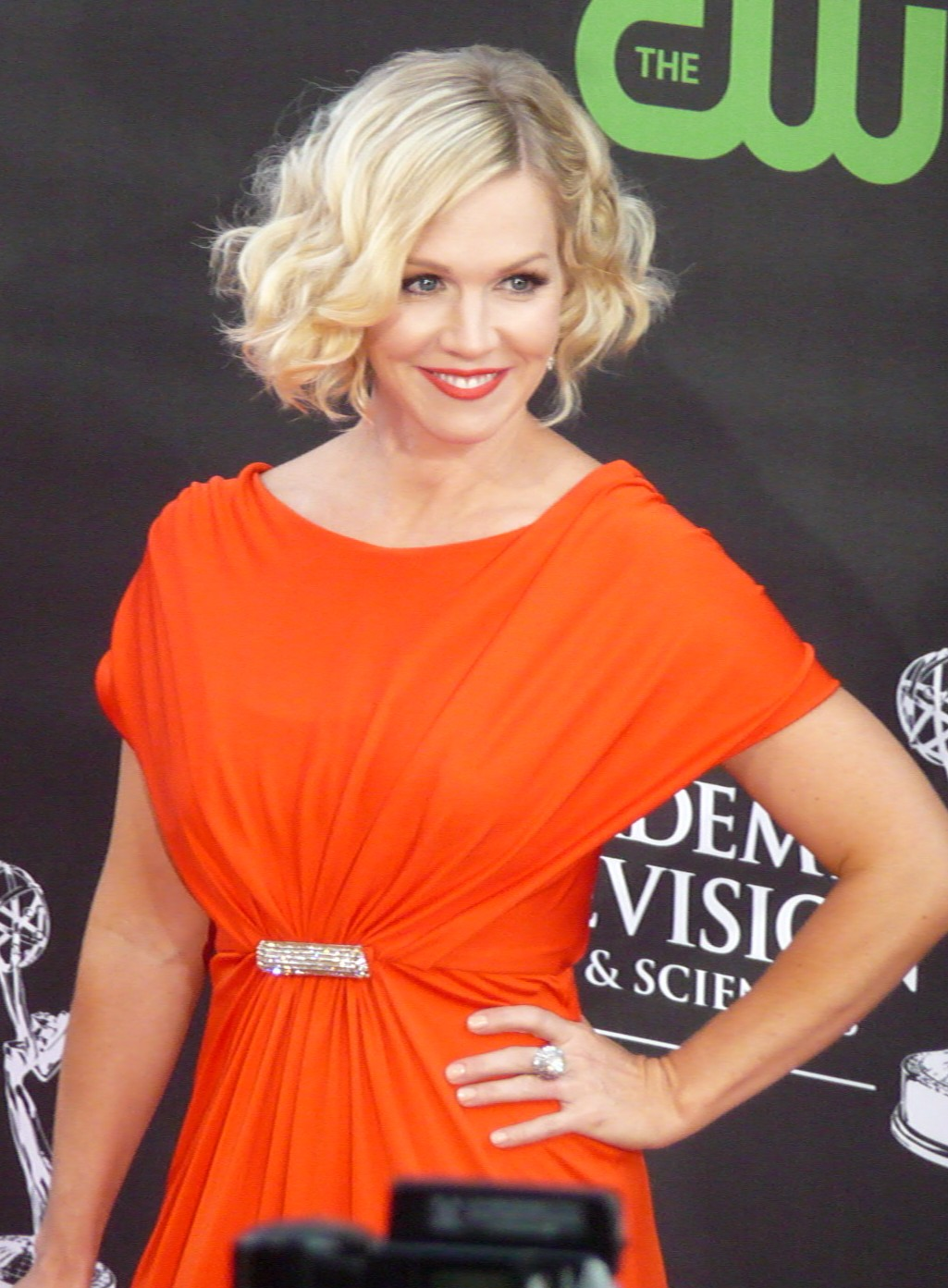
Jennie Garth in bright orange

The red carpet looks at the 2008 Emmys were particularly colourful, with bright tones such as red, blue and yellow proving popular. Colour was also worn by some of the male attendees, with Terry O'Quinn, whose yellow necktie matched his wife's dress, commenting "Black and white is pretty boring. I think we're evolving sartorially."

Hal Rubenstein of InStyle noted upswept hairstyles and sleek designs in bright colours, appropriate for the hot day, and a relative lack of over-indulgence and excess extravagance, while Lawrence Zarian of TV Guide Network commented on the popularity of outsize jewelry and sparkling embellishment.

== Other events ==
The tenth best dress of the decade according to InStyle was a jewelled peach tulle "femme fatale" Alberta Ferretti dress worn by Drew Barrymore to the Grey Gardens film premiere on 20 April 2009.
