= Family Guy season 16 =

Family Guy
- Season 16
- DVD cover
- Showrunners: Richard Appel; Alec Sulkin
- Starring: Seth MacFarlane; Alex Borstein; Seth Green; Mila Kunis; Mike Henry
- No. of episodes: 20

Release
- Original network: Fox
- Original release: October 1, 2017 – May 20, 2018

Season chronology
- ← Previous; Season 15 Next → Season 17

The sixteenth season of Family Guy aired on Fox in the United States from October 1, 2017, to May 20, 2018.

The series follows the dysfunctional Griffin family, consisting of father Peter, mother Lois, daughter Meg, son Chris, baby Stewie, and the family dog Brian, who reside in their hometown of Quahog. The executive producers for the sixteenth production season are Seth MacFarlane, Richard Appel, Alec Sulkin, Steve Callaghan, Danny Smith, and Kara Vallow. Sulkin returns after a two-season absence as the new showrunner for the series, replacing previous showrunner Callaghan. Appel continues to serve as showrunner alongside Sulkin.

The season features guest appearances from Bill Maher, Sir Ian McKellen, Kristen Bell, Louis C.K., and Modern Family cast members Ty Burrell, Julie Bowen, and Sofía Vergara.

The season also marks the final appearances of Adam West and Carrie Fisher following their deaths, as well as the show's 300th episode ("Dog Bites Bear").

As of season sixteen, the series' first-run cable syndication rights have switched from Adult Swim and TBS, who had premiered the first fifteen seasons, over to Disney-owned Freeform and FXX, who will continue to premiere new episodes on cable with the coming seasons. Freeform and FXX began exclusively broadcasting the first fifteen seasons starting in September 2021 when Family Guy officially went off Adult Swim and TBS.

== Marketing ==
Fox celebrated the series' 300th episode with a character customization website titled familyguyyourself.com in which users could create versions of themselves in the show's art style.

== Voice cast and characters ==
- Seth MacFarlane as Peter Griffin, Brian Griffin, Stewie Griffin, Glenn Quagmire, Tom Tucker, Carter Pewterschmidt, Dan Quagmire/Ida Davis
- Alex Borstein as Lois Griffin, Barbara Pewterschmidt
- Seth Green as Chris Griffin
- Mila Kunis as Meg Griffin
- Mike Henry as Cleveland Brown, Consuela

=== Supporting characters ===
- Gary Cole as Principal Shepard
- Carrie Fisher as Angela
- Ralph Garman as Lou Spinazola
- Phil LaMarr as Judge Dignified Q. Blackman
- Kevin Michael Richardson as Jerome
- Patrick Warburton as Joe Swanson
- Adam West as Mayor Adam West

== Episodes ==
No. overall	No. in season	Title	Directed by	Written by	Original release date	Prod. code	U.S. viewers (millions)
290	1	"Emmy-Winning Episode"	James Purdum, Dominic Bianchi & Peter Shin	Aaron Lee	October 1, 2017	FACX06	2.80
Peter goes out of his way to earn an Emmy win after getting fed up with not being nominated. He tries to make Family Guy more like several Emmy-nominated television shows, including Modern Family and Transparent. But a tip from Bill Maher lets Peter learn the true nature of the awards process and come to terms with his show's futile pursuit of recognition.
291	2	"Foxx in the Men House"	Brian Iles	Andrew Goldberg	October 8, 2017	EACX20	3.05
After hitting his head on the counter in the women's restroom at a restaurant, Peter befriends a paramedic named Stryker Foxx, who tended to his injury. He later dumps his friends, due to his friendship with Stryker giving him an inflated self-esteem. Later on, Peter comes to realize that he does not have the strength to do the activities that Stryker wants to do and a sky-diving experience results in Stryker's death, much to Peter's horror.
292	3	"Nanny Goats"	Steve Robertson	Tom Devanney	October 15, 2017	FACX02	2.54
Lois' mother, Barbara, hires a nanny for the Griffin family when she gets displeased with recent living arrangements for the kids. This enables Peter and Lois to revitalize with their love. However, they soon get tired of their couple time and nearly split up for good. The family nanny, Natalya, is actually a Belarusian assassin who saves Stewie from rival spies who open fire on the Griffin house.
293	4	"Follow the Money"	Mike Kim	Kevin Biggins	October 22, 2017	EACX15	2.69
Chris receives a misprinted but extremely valuable dollar on his birthday from Carter, but loses it. They then go on an adventure to find it. Meanwhile, Lois gets in a fight with Peter's nemesis Ernie, the giant chicken's wife.
294	5	"Three Directors"	Joe Vaux	Travis Bowe	November 5, 2017	EACX18	2.31
The story of Peter's firing from the Pawtucket Brewery, as told in the directorial styles of Quentin Tarantino, Wes Anderson, and Michael Bay.
295	6	"The D in Apartment 23"	Julius Wu	Artie Johann	November 12, 2017	FACX03	3.11
Brian's tweet involving Baywatch and Ride Along 3 comes back to scare him as it's deemed offensive and goes viral. Even though Brian deleted the tweet and all of his social media accounts, the Griffins are turned into outcasts by all of Quahog, prompting them to kick him out of the house until the situation blows over.
296	7	"Petey IV"	Mike Kim	Anthony Blasucci	November 19, 2017	FACX04	2.08
Continuing from the last episode, Vladimir Putin visits Quahog after Peter writes an email to him complaining about the ending to a Russian bootleg version of Rocky IV, where Ivan Drago wins the final fight. Meanwhile, in light of moving out, Brian gets a job at a suicide hotline center to obtain some money to pay the rent to Lou Spinazola, where he falls for his co-worker, Martha (voiced by Kristen Bell). He takes drastic measures when she rejects him.
297	8	"Crimes and Meg's Demeanor"	Greg Colton	Mike Desilets	December 3, 2017	FACX05	2.59
Continuing from the last episode, Meg takes up drinking at a high school party, which brings out her more outgoing and loosened side, both concerning and delighting Peter. Meanwhile, while recovering from a leg injury following the incident in the last episode (in a spoof of Rear Window), Brian suspects that Principal Shepherd has murdered his wife and enlists Stewie to help him out.
298	9	"Don't Be a Dickens at Christmas"	Jerry Langford	Danny Smith	December 10, 2017	FACX07	2.98
In a play on Charles Dickens' A Christmas Carol, Peter takes a journey around Quahog with the ghost of Patrick Swayze (voiced by Don Swayze) after he loses his Christmas spirit.
299	10	"Boy (Dog) Meets Girl (Dog)"	Brian Iles	Steve Callaghan	January 7, 2018	FACX09	3.40
After Brian becomes smitten with Ellie, a female show dog, he enters a dog show competition, where the winner will get to breed with her. Meanwhile, Peter and Lois attempt to convince Chris that "Arthur Valentine" is fake. When they are unable to do so, they kill Arthur Valentine which leads to Chris falling into depression.
300	11	"Dog Bites Bear"	John Holmquist	Cherry Chevapravatdumrong	January 14, 2018	FACX01	4.10
Brian and Stewie's friendship is put to the test after Brian shreds Rupert out of jealousy. The duo decide to travel to Vermont to spread Rupert's remains. Meanwhile, Peter meets his favorite cereal mascot, Boo Berry, and refuses to wash his right hand after shaking it with him, making his friends uncomfortable.
301	12	"Send in Stewie, Please"	Joe Vaux	Gary Janetti	March 18, 2018	FACX10	2.24
When Stewie gets sent to see his school's child psychologist Dr. Cecil Pritchfield for a surprising session, he reveals major secrets about himself that would make him more normal, which includes his fake English accent. He soon realizes that his secrets might come out, and decides not to help Dr. Pritchfield when he suffers a heart attack, choosing not to bring him his medication and letting him die, although he feels haunted by his decision as he falls asleep that night. Note: This episode premiered on Fox without commercial interruption due to a sponsorship agreement with Sony Interactive Entertainment for their PlayStation 4 game God of War, which was the sole advertiser at the end of this episode.
302	13	"V Is for Mystery"	Joseph Lee	David A. Goodman	March 25, 2018	FACX08	1.91
In a parody of Sherlock Holmes, the episode depicts Sherlock Holmes (portrayed by Stewie) and Dr. Watson (portrayed by Brian) as they embark on solving a string of murder mysteries.
303	14	"Veteran Guy"	John Holmquist	Patrick Meighan	April 1, 2018	FACX11	2.05
Peter pretends to be a veteran after buying a cap with the name USS Nathan James on it, along with Joe and Cleveland, annoying Quagmire, who is an actual veteran. After they are caught, they are sentenced to join the U.S. Coast Guard, where they must stop a bomb plot by four frat boys.
304	15	"The Woof of Wall Street"	Steve Robertson	Alex Carter	April 8, 2018	FACX12	1.93
Stewie teaches Brian how to invest in the stock market, but even after discovering that the product he is investing in uses dog meat, Brian doesn't bother to change his mind. Meanwhile, Peter, Joe, Cleveland, and Quagmire look after the Drunken Clam while Jerome is away which ends up being a disaster.
305	16	"Family Guy Through the Years"	Julius Wu	Chris Sheridan	April 22, 2018	FACX13	2.00
Family Guy is reimagined as a series that has been on the air for 60 years, and in a special retrospective, it looks back at the cultural events and issues that were tackled on the show in the 1950s, '60s and '70s.
306	17	"Switch the Flip"	Mike Kim	Kevin Biggins	April 29, 2018	FACX14	2.26
Stewie uses one of his inventions to swap voices with Brian in order to fix his life, but this plan backfires as chaos quickly ensues around Quahog.
307	18	"HTTPete"	Greg Colton	Damien Fahey	May 6, 2018	FACX15	1.92
In order to promote the brewery, Peter adopts the millennial lifestyle. This attracts a high-powered Silicon Valley executive's attention.
308	19	"The Unkindest Cut"	Jerry Langford	Mark Hentemann	May 13, 2018	FACX16	2.15
On a boat trip with his friends, Quagmire is attacked by a shark and loses his penis during the attack; with this, he struggles with living without his most treasured body part. Ida helps to get his life back on track. Meanwhile, Stewie and Brian try to find Mort after they discover that the FBI has put a reward on him, due to him being involved in a drug scam.
309	20	"Are You There God? It's Me, Peter"	Joseph Lee	Travis Bowe	May 20, 2018	FACX17	1.83
When Peter falls into a coma and gets the opportunity to have a conversation with God, he interrogates the deity with some tough questions.
