= It's a Brad, Brad World =

Television series

- Genre: Reality television
- Starring: Brad Goreski
- Country of origin: United States
- Original language: English
- No. of seasons: 2
- No. of episodes: 16

Production
- Executive producers: Chris Huvane; Darin Friedman; Eric Kranzler; Jennifer Ferraro Goodman; Melissa Stokes; Nick Emmerson
- Running time: 44 minutes (season 1); 22 minutes (season 2)
- Production companies: Shed Media; Television 360

Original release
- Network: Bravo
- Release: January 12, 2012 – April 24, 2013

Related
- The Rachel Zoe Project

It's a Brad, Brad World is an American reality documentary television series on Bravo. The series debuted on January 12, 2012. On August 29, 2012, Bravo announced that the series has been renewed for a second season which debuted on March 6, 2013.

== Premise ==
The series follows Brad Goreski as he breaks away from his career as the assistant of Rachel Zoe and establishes his solo career. Goreski is shown working with celebrity clients along with attempting to share his talents to other designers.

== Cast ==
- Brad Goreski: Goreski, former style director for Rachel Zoe, was born and raised in Port Perry, Ontario, Canada and has lived in Los Angeles, California for the past nine years. During summer breaks while attending the University of Southern California, Brad interned at Vogue and W magazines. After graduating with a B.A. in Art History, Brad landed a position as the Vogue West Coast assistant. After a chance meeting with stylist Rachel Zoe, Brad began working for her in 2008 and was eventually featured in the popular series The Rachel Zoe Project. After three seasons on the show, Goreski parted ways with Zoe to pursue his own career as a stylist.
- Gary Janetti: Goreski's long-term boyfriend.
- Lindsay Myers: Goreski's assistant and close friend.

== Episodes ==
=== Series overview ===
Season	Episodes	Originally released	
Season	Episodes	First released	Last released
1	8	January 2, 2012	February 27, 2012
2	8	March 6, 2013	April 24, 2013

=== Season 1 (2012) ===
No. overall	No. in season	Title	Original release date	U.S. viewers (millions)
1	1	"Haute in Hollywood"	January 2, 2012	1.00
Brad styles R&B singer Keri Hilson's dress for the Met Ball.
2	2	"Canadian Takeover"	January 9, 2012	0.73
Brad flies to New York City, where he looks to hire a personal assistant, works on a photo shoot for Gilt Groupe and tries to sell a photo spread to Details.
3	3	"The Motherload"	January 16, 2012	0.93
Brad prepares for his appearance on The Nate Berkus Show, meets with his co-writer for his memoir, and later Brad's mother and sister meet Gary's family.
4	4	"Sweat Home Alabama"	January 23, 2012	1.19
Lindsay and Brad go office space hunting. Gary and Brad work out the details for their 10-year anniversary celebration. Later, Lindsay and Brad fly to Alabama.
5	5	"Broken Promises"	January 30, 2012	0.97
Brad flies back to New York City for a photo shoot with Details. Brad meets with his client, Shay Mitchell, and later receives bad news about his dad.
6	6	"Ciao, Brad!"	February 13, 2012	0.62
Gary and Brad head to Milan for fashion week and a small vacation. Brad is also handed the task of finding a dress for Jessica Alba.
7	7	"I Wore It Best"	February 20, 2012	0.53
Gary and Brad's anniversary party is being put together. Brad has a fitting with Shay Mitchell. goes back to New York and finally gets to view his finished product in a magazine.
8	8	"The Big Day"	February 27, 2012	0.56
Gary is under pressure while planning a big surprise for Brad while Brad is working on a fashion photo shoot.

=== Season 2 (2013) ===
No. overall	No. in season	Title	Original release date	U.S. viewers (millions)
9	1	"Crushing It, Killing It"	March 6, 2013	0.75
Brad works to style thirty looks for Kate Spade New York’s Spring/Summer 2013 collection while making time for his celebrity clients as New York Fashion Week is quickly approaching. The teams quickly comes together to for an emergency dress fitting with Minka Kelly. In the end, Brad is able to attend Jenny Packham's and Monique Lhullier's runway shows.
10	2	"One Client, Two Calls"	March 13, 2013	0.54
Brad is busy with New York Fashion Week taking place, and works to style supermodel Petra Nemcova for the Diesel Black Gold Fashion Show. Petra later contacts Brad when she has an emergency with her outfit. With all the chaos of fashion week, Brad’s assistant Thomas fails to deliver a gown which leads to Brad having to make an uneasy decision.
11	3	"Making Fashion History"	March 20, 2013	0.62
Brad and his team return to Los Angeles. The team prepares for a fitting with actress Rashida Jones, who will be attending a premiere in Zurich and an appearance on Conan. Hannah and Brad style a magazine shoot with transgender model Connie Fleming. Brad and Gary discuss their upcoming move into a new house.
12	4	"Make My Day Perfect"	March 27, 2013	0.49
Brad is ready to jet off to Toronto with Lindsay for a family visit until his photo shoot with J Brand is rescheduled which leaves Hannah and Thomas to prepare by themselves. Brad returns to Los Angeles for the J Brand shoot and Hannah reveals some shocking news. Later, Gary informs Brad about his new job in London.
13	5	"Moving the Fashion World"	April 3, 2013	0.47
Brad works with actress Beth Behrs to achieve her spot on the best dressed list while coordinating the move with Gary into their new home. While away, Brad counts on Hannah and Thomas to take leadership and discover looks for his fitting with Beth for an AMFAR event. Later, Brad returns to an empty home when he returns which turns into a last emotional moment prior to the couple closing one door and opening another.
14	6	"A, E, I, O, U"	April 10, 2013	0.54
Brad is hired by Noot Seear and Coco Rocha. Coco has Brad style her for Naomi Campbell's television series premiere party but later Brad realizes he may have misjudged her taste. Noot assigns Brad the task of styling an upcoming ad campaign for her headphone line. Back at home, Gary and Brad begin turning their house into a home.
15	7	"Dubai Bye"	April 17, 2013	0.56
Brad and Lindsay fly to Dubai to assist with the launch of the Kate Spade New York brand. Brad has a hard time adjusting with the differentiating social environment and language barrier. Later, a post-party camel ride ends with a surprising side of Brad emerging.
16	8	"Human Disco Ball"	April 24, 2013	0.57
Brad composes an outfit for Stacy Keibler who will be presenting at the American Music Awards. Hurricane Sandy puts a damper on Brad's plans to shop around New York City showrooms, which leads him to fly in items from Los Angeles. Later, Brad and Gary's families come together to see their new house and enjoy a housewarming dinner.
