= The Rachel Zoe Project =

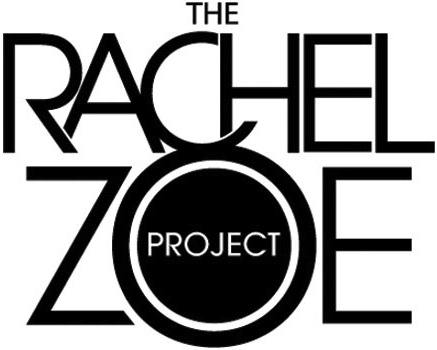
- Genre: Reality
- Starring: Rachel Zoe; Rodger Berman; Joey Maalouf; Brad Goreski; Taylor Jacobson; Jeremiah Brent
- Theme music composer: Heloise and the Savoir Faire
- Country of origin: United States
- No. of seasons: 5
- No. of episodes: 38

Production
- Executive producers: Angie Day; Banks Tarver; Derek W. Wan; Ken Druckerman; Rachel Zoe
- Running time: 43 minutes
- Production companies: Left/Right Productions; Original Media

Original release
- Network: Bravo
- Release: September 9, 2008 – April 24, 2013

Related
- It's a Brad, Brad World

The Rachel Zoe Project is an American reality television series starring celebrity stylist Rachel Zoe. The series premiered on September 9, 2008 on Bravo.

The show was confirmed by Bravo for a second season on December 5, 2008. Production began in January 2009. Season 3 premiered on August 3, 2010 on Bravo. Season 4 premiered on September 6, 2011 on Bravo. Zoe confirmed that the series had been picked up for a fifth season in September 2012. The fifth season debuted on March 6, 2013. The show was cancelled in 2013.

== Synopsis ==
The series follows the life of Rachel Zoe while she expands her business and attempts to balance her personal and professional life.

== Cast ==
=== Main ===
- Rachel Zoe, celebrity fashion stylist, author, clothing designer and entrepreneur based in Los Angeles, California
- Rodger Berman, Rachel Zoe's husband and business manager
- Joey Maalouf, Zoe's hairdresser and best friend
- Brad Goreski (seasons 1–3), Zoe's associate and style director
- Taylor Jacobson (seasons 1–2), Zoe's styling associate
- Jeremiah Brent (season 4), Zoe's styling associate

=== Supporting ===
- Marisa Lee Runyon, Rachel's assistant
- Jordan (seasons 3–4), Zoe's styling associate
- Mandana Dayani (season 4-5), vice president of Rachel Zoe Inc.

== Episodes ==
Season	Episodes	Originally released	
Season	Episodes	First released	Last released
1	6	September 9, 2008	October 14, 2008
2	8	August 24, 2009	October 12, 2009
3	8	August 3, 2010	September 21, 2010
4	8	September 6, 2011	October 25, 2011
5	8	March 6, 2013	April 24, 2013

=== Season 1 (2008) ===
No. overall	No. in season	Title	Original release date
0	0	"Preview Special"	August 4, 2008
1	1	"Fashion Makes the Star, Makes the Fashion"	September 9, 2008
Rachel Zoe is under pressure to find the consummate red carpet gown for actress Joy Bryant. Rachel's styling associate and right-hand woman, Taylor, has doubts about the newly hired, over-eager assistant, Brad. Guest appearances: Joy Bryant and Michael Kors
2	2	"Award Season, That's Bananas!"	September 16, 2008
Award season has arrived, and Rachel Zoe has three days to find the perfect dress for Emmy-Award-winning actress, Debra Messing, to wear to the highly anticipated Golden Globes Awards. Her new assistant, Brad is put to the test when Taylor calls in sick. Guest appearance: Debra Messing
3	3	"Fashion Week to Die"	September 23, 2008
It is Rachel's favorite time of year: New York Fashion Week! The entire Zoe Camp heads to New York, where Rachel visits her good friend, fashion designer Marc Jacobs, and views the runway collections of Michael Kors and Donna Karan at Bryant Park. Guest appearances: Michael Kors and Donna Karan
4	4	"Fashion the Cruel Mistress"	September 30, 2008
Rachel Zoe and her team are in New York for Fashion Week, where they meet up with Diane Von Furstenberg and Oscar De La Renta. Rachel handles the stressful time by going on an extravagant shopping spree, while Brad has to prove he can handle working on his own. Guest appearances: Diane von Fürstenberg, Oscar de la Renta, Marc Jacobs and Zac Posen
5	5	"Awash in Red Carpet"	October 7, 2008
In the midst of Oscar madness, Rachel Zoe is hit with a family emergency. The main event is only a week away, and she is faced with the decision to stay in Los Angeles and work, or to attend her uncle's funeral. Guest appearance: Molly Sims
6	6	"Shut It Down at the Oscars"	October 14, 2008
The Oscars have arrived and the Zoe camp is in full award mode. Tension grows between Taylor and Brad as the team labors to create the picture perfect red carpet moment for five of Rachel's A-list clients. The pressure proves too much for Brad to handle. Guest appearance: Jennifer Garner

=== Season 2 (2009) ===
No. overall	No. in season	Title	Original release date
7	1	"Dressless for the Globes"	August 24, 2009
Awards season is right around the corner and Team Zoe has been charged with the task of styling five of the hottest stars to grace the 2009 Golden Globes Red Carpet. Rachel works around the clock to hunt down the best dresses for A-listers Anne Hathaway, Eva Mendes and Debra Messing.
8	2	"Front Row at New York Fashion Week"	August 31, 2009
The tension is high, with just days to go until Academy Award Best Actress nominee Anne Hathaway has to walk the red carpet — and Rachel still hasn't found her the perfect gown. As Zoe and Brad race against the clock scouring Fashion Week collections in New York, Taylor is left to pick up the slack back in LA. Guest appearances: Lindsay Lohan, Giorgio Armani and Diane von Fürstenberg
9	3	"Star Studded Oscar Week"	September 7, 2009
Awards season is in full swing and Rachel gives a shocked Brad the sole responsibility of styling Oscar nominated actress, Anne Hathaway, for the big night. This is Brad's shot to redeem himself from last year's disaster and prove to Team Zoe that he won't let them down again. Guest appearance: Liv Tyler
10	4	"'Pin Thin' and Pissed Off"	September 14, 2009
Rachel is distraught when she becomes the victim of another vicious tabloid attack. Taylor tells Rachel to let it go but Rachel can't seem to shake it and things only get worse as Rachel steps out of her comfort zone to model for Marie Claire magazine. Guest appearances: Nicole Richie and Natalia Vodianova
11	5	"Meltdown"	September 21, 2009
Rachel styles a massive photo shoot for Glamour Magazine, while Taylor continues to be defeated by her inability to move up the ranks and contemplates leaving Team Zoe. When Rachel collapses at the studio, it becomes clear that the strenuous demands of her job are taking their toll. Guest appearance: Ashton Kutcher
12	6	"Paris Dilemma"	September 28, 2009
Despite doctor's orders to take it easy, the ever-present demands on Rachel keep seeping into her life and onto her calendar. With Paris Fashion Week rapidly approaching, Rachel realizes that she can't take both Brad and Taylor with her and decides to let the two figure out for themselves who will go and who will "stay back".
13	7	"Unforgettable Paris"	October 5, 2009
Rachel and Brad travel to Paris for Fashion Week to check out the latest collections and rub shoulders with design celebrities such as Karl Lagerfeld, John Galliano and Marc Jacobs. Taylor's left behind in LA to keep the studio running, and her resentment towards her increasing workload grows. Guest appearances: Christian Lacroix, Esteban Cortazar, Giambattista Valli, Karl Lagerfeld, John Galliano and Marc Jacobs
14	8	"Fashion Overload"	October 12, 2009
Rachel's juggling a high fashion editorial shoot and the launch of the Rachel Zoe brand. But when Taylor threatens to walk out the door forever, the stress causes a relapse of Rachel's vertigo. Rachel realizes some big changes must be made, or else she can't move forward with the expansion of Rachel Zoe, Inc. Guest appearance: Jessica Stam

=== Season 3 (2010) ===
No. overall	No. in season	Title	Original release date
15	1	"Changes in the Zoe Camp"	August 3, 2010
There are major changes in the Zoe Camp as Taylor is fired and Rachel is left to deal with the resulting emotional turmoil. To make matters worse, the team has an important Harper's Bazaar cover shoot with Demi Moore, and all must prove they can cope without Taylor. Guest appearance: Demi Moore
16	2	"The Golden Globes"	August 10, 2010
Rachel has four clients going to the Golden Globes – Kate Hudson, Cameron Diaz, Jennifer Garner, and a new pregnant client, Paula Patton. Ashley, the new Style Assistant, begins working for team Zoe and it's fashion chaos to the max when actress Molly Sims comes to the studio needing dresses for two events. Guest appearance: Molly Sims
17	3	"Hustling for Haiti"	August 17, 2010
Rachel heads to New York City to spend some quality time with Rodger and take pre-Fashion Week meetings, one of which is with singer-songwriter/fashion designer Gwen Stefani. Rachel’s plans get turned on their head when Naomi Campbell calls and asks her to style a 92-look runway show for charity that will open New York Fashion Week. Guest appearances: Gwen Stefani and Naomi Campbell
18	4	"NYC Fashion Week --- The Hunt for Oscar Gowns"	August 24, 2010
Fashion Week begins and Rachel has two clients presenting awards at the Oscars. It's Brad’s first time at fashion week without Taylor, and the pressure is on as he seeks to prove he can find the perfect dress for Rachel’s clients. Rachel and Rodger’s anniversary falls during fashion week, but the high demand on Team Zoe leaves no time to celebrate. Guest appearances: Jessica Biel, Demi Moore, Brian Atwood, Oscar de la Renta and Donna Karan
19	5	"Milan Fashion Week"	August 31, 2010
En route to Milan Fashion Week, Rachel detours to London to see client Kate Hudson. Rodger is enthused that Rachel seems to be relaxing, and begins to believe she is recognizing the importance of a life outside of work. Unfortunately, the reprieve doesn’t last. As soon as Rachel arrives in Milan, she finds she has lost an Oscar gown from a New York show, and becomes desperate to find an adequate replacement. Guest appearances: Kate Hudson and Julianne Moore
20	6	"The Oscars and Figure Skater — Johnny Weir"	September 7, 2010
Back in Los Angeles, fashion disaster strikes again when the gown that Rachel thought she had secured in Milan for Demi Moore's Oscar moment doesn't fit the bill. Guest appearance: Demi Moore
21	7	"Zoe vs. Zoe"	September 14, 2010
Zoe impersonator, Amy Phillips, stops by the studio to shoot a webisode with Team Zoe. Rodger becomes increasingly frustrated with Rachel as tensions rise when he feels disrespected by the team, which escalates into a full blown fight in front of their staff. Shortly afterward, Rodger has a heart-to-heart with Brad and expresses his desire for things to change with his wife. On the styling front, Brad takes on a major advertising campaign featuring Molly Sims. Guest appearances: Beau Garrett and Molly Sims
22	8	"Fashion Addiction"	September 21, 2010
Team Zoe arrives in New York City for the annual Met Ball, where they're styling four A-list clients, in addition to Rachel attending the gala herself. Back in LA, Rachel is filling her schedule with an increasing list of jobs, including a Bardot-inspired shoot for UK magazine, Love. The rest of Team Zoe is more concerned than ever with their leader's inability to slow down. Rodger's mounting frustration comes to a head after a trip to the fertility clinic. Guest appearance: Anne Hathaway

=== Season 4 (2011) ===
No. overall	No. in season	Title	Original release date	U.S. viewers (millions)
23	1	"New Beginnings, Big Changes"	September 6, 2011	1.25
In the season premiere, Rachel Zoe, Inc. is growing exponentially, and so is Rachel's family. With a baby on the way, Rodger looks for a bigger house, while Rachel sets her eyes on launching her new fashion line. Following an Elle Magazine photoshoot with her hubby, Rachel and Rodger jet off to a round of interviews for a potential new junior stylist to replace Brad. Hopefully she'll slow down and take it easy, Rachel tries to manage it all leaving Rodger concerned for her health and well-being.
24	2	"Launching Rachel's Line"	September 13, 2011	0.89
Rachel heads to NYC to work on her collection, but can new hire Jeremiah handle the pressure?
25	3	"Rodger's Temper and Kim Kardashian Are Hot"	September 20, 2011	0.82
Rachel juggles a major shoot with Kim K -- and Rodger's need to decompress before the baby.
26	4	"Rodger Goes to Vegas and Rachel Moves Out"	September 27, 2011	0.80
Jeremiah rushes to prep the house for Rachel and Rodger, while Rodger jets off to Vegas for a boys' weekend.
27	5	"Oscar Madness"	October 4, 2011	0.86
It's Oscar week and Rachel arrives at a special career moment by fashioning Oscar host Anne Hathaway. In domestic news, Rachel and Rodger celebrate their anniversary, but Rachel's hectic schedule and a regrettable gossip-column piece mar the big day.
28	6	"Bathing Suits & Big Changes"	October 11, 2011	0.78
A pregnant Rachel appoints Joey and Jeremiah to assist her with a magazine shoot. Jeremiah's elated to be working on such a high-profile style assignment, yet he suspects Rachel might not want him involved. Elsewhere, Jeremiah contacts Rodger about an idea to launch a home line.
29	7	"OMG, He's Here"	October 18, 2011	1.17
It's couture shock when Rachel goes into labor. This causes a frantic rush to prepare for the baby's arrival and triggers the hiring of a former staffer to finish the nursery. Elsewhere, Joey braves his first solo style job by dressing actress Molly Sims in New York.
30	8	"Baby Changes Everything"	October 25, 2011	1.06
Unwilling to part with baby boy Skyler on her first day back to work, Rachel brings him on set, only to discover that balancing work and motherhood is not only overwhelming, but will be an adjustment for both her and everyone else.

=== Season 5 (2013) ===
No. overall	No. in season	Title	Original release date	U.S. viewers (millions)
31	1	"New York Fashion Week: It's Everything"	March 6, 2013	0.85
In the season premiere, stylist, designer and mom Rachel Zoe is set to debut her spring collection at Mercedes-Benz Fashion Week in New York City with the help of her team, but when a gossip column prints a story that her collection is failing, she must pull out all the stops for her first big show, while still making time to check out other designers including Prabal Gurung, Oscar de la Renta, Marchesa, and Michael Kors. Can she rise above the fray and launch her career as a major designer, or will her critics get the best of her?
32	2	"Fashion to the Maxi"	March 13, 2013	0.65
33	3	"Paris Fashion Week"	March 20, 2013	0.59
34	4	"Zoe Much to Do, Zoe Little Time"	March 27, 2013	0.57
35	5	"Maj in Manhattan"	April 3, 2013	0.51
36	6	"Godzilla Rachel!"	April 10, 2013	0.55
37	7	"A Sister for Sky?"	April 17, 2013	0.66
38	8	"Zoe Coture: Styling the Stylist"	April 24, 2013	0.73
