= Hazel Douglas =

English actress (1923–2016)

- Born: Hazel Smith; 2 November 1923; Fulham, London, England
- Died: 8 September 2016 (aged 92); London, England
- Education: Royal Academy of Dramatic Art
- Occupation: Actress
- Years active: 1947–2016
- Spouse: Peter Sawford (m. 1949; died 1991)

Hazel Douglas (2 November 1923 – 8 September 2016) was an English actress. She portrayed Bathilda Bagshot in Harry Potter and the Deathly Hallows – Part 1.

Her credits stretch back to the early days of television, and include Sunday Night Theatre, The Worst Week of My Life, Eyes Down, The IT Crowd, Gavin & Stacey, Run Fatboy Run, Casualty, The Royal, Asylum, The Bill, Where the Heart Is, Gimme Gimme Gimme, At Home with the Braithwaites, The Liver Birds and Vicious.

Douglas spent eleven years with Brian Rix's company in the Whitehall farces, joining in 1954 for John Chapman's Dry Rot, which ran for more than 1,400 performances. These comedies were also televised, and she appeared in episodes of the one-off comedies in the series Dial RIX (1962–63), with Rix and his wife Elspet Gray. Rix used to say that Hazel had the best double-take in the business.

== Recent work ==
In 2009, she played the role of Mrs Harries, the mother of Josephine Tewson in the radio drama, Leaves in Autumn by Susan Casanove, a Wireless Theatre Company production. In 2010, she appeared as Peggy Lowe in the Jo Brand BBC4 comedy Getting On. She also has the minor role of Maureen Bright in the BBC soap opera, Doctors in 2011. In 2013 she appeared in the British sitcom Vicious starring Ian McKellen and Derek Jacobi as Mildred, Stuart's (Jacobi) mother. Most recently, Douglas portrayed Edna Locke in an episode of the 2014 detective drama Suspects.

== Personal life ==
Douglas was born Hazel Smith in London. She served in the Royal Navy, where she met her husband, Peter Sawford; they married in 1949 and remained together until his death in 1991.

She died on 8 September 2016 at the age of 92.

== Partial filmography ==
- The Night We Got the Bird (1961) – Bespectacled Lady
- Closing Numbers (1993) – Mary
- The Young Poisoner's Handbook (1995) – Edna
- Face (1997) – Linda
- The Parole Officer (2001) – Old Lady in Art Gallery
- Asylum (2005) – Lilly
- Run Fatboy Run (2007) – Older Woman
- Gavin & Stacey (2008) – Betty
- Harry Potter and the Deathly Hallows – Part 1 (2010) – Bathilda Bagshot
- Albatross (2011) – Granny
- The Great Martian War 1913–1917 (2013) – Alice Hale

Agatha Christie Poirot (2013) - Mrs. Matcham (S13/E1)
