= Emmy-Winning Episode =

- Family Guy episode
- Promotional image for the episode
- Episode no.: Season 16; Episode 1
- Directed by: James Purdum; Dominic Bianchi; Peter Shin; James R. Bagdonas (live-action sequence)
- Written by: Aaron Lee
- Production code: FACX06
- Original air date: October 1, 2017

Guest appearances
- Asa Akira as herself (live-action sequence); Julie Bowen as herself; Ty Burrell as himself (live-action sequence); Louis C.K. as himself; Frances Callier as Shonda Rhimes; Jonathan Kite as Alec Baldwin; Bill Maher as himself; Miriam Margolyes as Maggie Smith's Right Eyeball; Ryan O'Neal as Tim Madden (uncredited archive footage from Tough Guys Don't Dance); Christina Pickles as Maggie Smith's Left Eyeball; Sofía Vergara as herself

Episode chronology
← Previous "A House Full of Peters"	Next → "Foxx in the Men House"
- Family Guy season 16

"Emmy-Winning Episode" is the sixteenth season premiere of the American animated sitcom Family Guy, and the 290th episode overall. It aired on Fox in the United States on October 1, 2017, and is written by Aaron Lee and directed by James Purdum, Dominic Bianchi, and Peter Shin, with James R. Bagdonas directing the live-action chicken fight. Guest voices include Louis C.K., Jonathan Kite, Bill Maher, Miriam Margolyes, Christina Pickles, Modern Family cast members Ty Burrell, Julie Bowen, and Sofía Vergara, and a live-action cameo from Asa Akira.

== Plot ==
As the Griffin family is watching Vedder Call Saul, Peter is displeased that Family Guy hasn't won a single Emmy since it debuted in 1999, and the crossover with The Simpsons didn't help (in reality, the show had won six by the time the episode aired). Lois even mentions that they shouldn't do another episode with The Simpsons because it only helped the other show (or made Family Guy look bad when fans condemned The Simpsons for agreeing to the crossover at all). Peter then embarks on his own For Your Consideration campaign by spoofing other shows who won the award.

Peter first aims at winning an Emmy for Best Comedy, which includes Modern Family, Girls and Transparent, and other comedy traits (with two being Sofía Vergara taking Lois' role, Lois portraying a delivery person, Chris acting like Sheldon Cooper from The Big Bang Theory, a pass-by from Tracy Morgan, and Peter playing transgender). He even encounters Louis C.K. outside the Drunken Clam, where the comedian says he's glad his career has cooled off just enough that Peter was able to get him to make a cameo on the show. When Peter goes into the bar, everyone greets him in the style of Norm Peterson from Cheers. After that, Peter is sent to the hospital, where Dr. Hartman comes in to change his sex. Peter insists that it was just a gag, and Hartman continues on anyway. His final narration on that has him stating "And that's how I became your mother."

The comedy submission fails, as the Emmy producers hate it and say that Family Guy now owes them an Emmy. Brian insists on moving to Best Drama in which spoofs of Breaking Bad, The Wire, Homeland, The Sopranos, Orange Is the New Black, House of Cards, and Game of Thrones follow. The sketch ends with the Night King about to attack Peter with an undead dragon. It is watched by two people and a dragon, who feels that he and his fellow dragons were accurately represented.

The drama submission also fails, because a message from the Emmy board demands that Peter stop, but he refuses and continues trying to make more Emmy spoofs including stunts, documentaries, reality shows and castings in a comedy series – enough for him to do some interaction with a live-action Asa Akira. After doing a spoof of The Daily Show, he is called aside by Bill Maher, who states that Family Guy will never win an Emmy, due to the fact that the same shows other than it win the award every year. Taking Maher's tip-off, Peter goes to the library, where he sees a lot of names and shows that won Emmys.

Peter returns home to tell Lois about it where she reveals that they have a selection of Emmy winners visiting them: C.K., Alec Baldwin, Julie Bowen, Tina Fey, Kelsey Grammer, Julia Louis-Dreyfus, Shonda Rhimes, and Aaron Sorkin. They pick at the show's faults such as constantly plagiarizing other media, that many minority characters are voiced by white actors, the contrived episode wrap-ups and that the show is just a complete waste of time.

Realizing that Family Guy will never win an Emmy, Peter finally gives up and is happy to have his family as his award. An email that Peter reads from a chemotherapy patient mistakes the show for The Simpsons, with the fan stating how he liked the episode where Homer stays home from church. Peter ends the episode with a live-action sequence of Ty Burrell fighting and strangling a rubber chicken. The hand of an unidentified man presents him with an Emmy Award, but Burrell tells the man that he does not have any more room in his house for it.

== Reception ==
The episode was watched by audience of 2.80 million viewers, making it the fourth most-watched show on Fox that night after Ghosted, The Simpsons and Bob's Burgers.

Jesse Schedeen, a staff writer for IGN, gave the episode a 7.6/10. He noted "Like The Simpsons, Family Guy kicked off its new season with a themed episode tonight. Surprisingly, of the two it was Family Guy that emerged the clear winner. This series tends to have a solid track record whenever it gets unusually meta, and 'Emmy-Winning Episode' was no exception". Schedeen praised the first and second acts; however, he criticized the third act.
