= Derek Blasberg =

American fashion writer (born 1982)

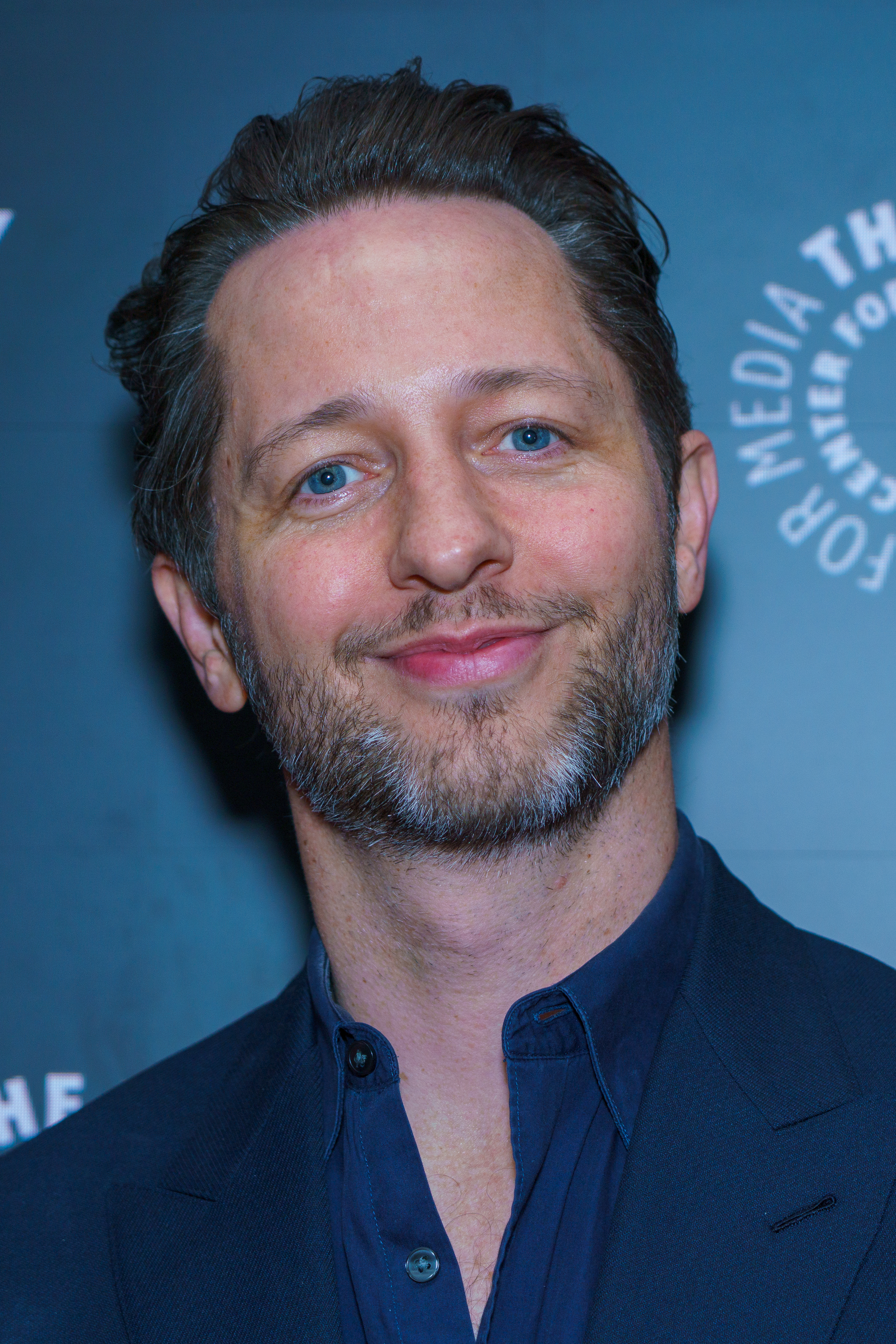
- Blasberg in 2026
- Born: Derek Charles Blasberg; April 22, 1982 (age 44); St. Louis, Missouri, U.S.
- Education: New York University
- Occupations: Writer; Editor; Curator
- Years active: 2002–present
- Website: DerekBlasberg.com

Derek Charles Blasberg (born April 22, 1982) is an American author and fashion industry personality. He is a director at the Gagosian Gallery, Vanity Fair's special correspondent, and a columnist for Harpers Bazaar. He was the head of fashion & beauty at YouTube from 2018 to 2022.

== Early life ==
Blasberg was born in St. Louis, Missouri, to Bill Blasberg, a certified public accountant, and Carol Blasberg, the managing editor of the medical journal The Annals of Thoracic Surgery. In 2000, Blasberg graduated from Affton High School, where he was salutatorian of his class.

== Career ==
=== College years and early career ===
In 2000, Blasberg moved to New York City to attend New York University (NYU). While a student, Blasberg's first job was with Elite Model Management, writing biographies for the agency's models; he worked in a similar position for European modeling agency Models 1 during a semester abroad in London. Blasberg held a part-time position at W magazine upon returning for his junior year of college. During his senior year, he worked part-time as an assistant at Vogue. After his 2004 graduation from NYU, he transitioned to a full-time position with Vogue.

=== Writing ===
Over a career spanning more than two decades chronicling the worlds of fashion, art, and pop culture, Blasberg's byline has appeared in every international edition of Vanity Fair, Vogue, Architectural Digest, and Harpers Bazaar. He has also regularly contributed to The New York Times, the Wall Street Journal, and W magazine.

Blasberg's first job was as an assistant to the managing editor at Vogue magazine.

From 2006 to 2010, Blasberg was the editor-at-large of Style.com, where he wrote a column called "The Blasblog." He also co-wrote several New York City editions of the Louis Vuitton Travel Guides.

In 2008, Blasberg was the editor of Influence, a fashion and art tome conceived by Mary-Kate and Ashley Olsen.

From 2009 to 2012, he wrote a column called "Fast + Louche" for Interview magazine. In 2026, the columns were turned into a photo book called Fast + Louche, curated by the Paris-based publisher Just an Idea.<https://justanidea.com/products/derek-c-blasberg>

In April 2010, Blasberg's debut book, Classy: Exceptional Advice for the Extremely Modern Lady, was published. It was a collection of humorous essays about etiquette and was on The New York Times best seller list for several weeks. In October 2011, Blasberg wrote a sequel to Classy titled Very Classy: Even More Exceptional Advice for the Extremely Modern Lady, which expanded and updated the original version.

In February 2015, Blasberg was known as "one of fashion blogging's biggest names" for a website called Mr. Blasberg, although that ended when Condé Nast abruptly sold NowManifest, the advertising platform which he and others had used since 2010.

Blasberg has retained roles as editor-at-large roles for Harper's BAZAAR, V and VMan magazines, and London-based arts publication Garage Magazine for which he wrote a column, "Emails from the Edge". Under Graydon Carter, he was Vanity Fair's Our Man on the Street.

Blasberg began his career at the Gagosian Gallery as a senior staffer in 2013 writing the Gagosian Quarterly column, "In Conversation". He is currently the Executive Editor of the gallery's magazine. In 2023, Blasberg co-curated Avedon 100, an exhibition celebrating the centennial of the Richard Avedon, one of the most renowned photographer's of the 20th century. It received the Lucie Awards for Gallery Show of the Year.

In September 2015, Blasberg wrote Harper's BAZAAR: Models, chronicling the real lives of the "women who changed fashion and helped bring it to life" over six decades of style in the pages of Harpers Bazaar. The book features a foreword written by Karl Lagerfeld.

=== Television ===
Blasberg hosted several of Vanity Fair 's first-ever web series, including one titled "Conversations In The Backseat" where he interviewed Reese Witherspoon, Gigi Hadid, Naomi Campbell, Maria Sharapova, Rosie Huntington-Whiteley, and other celebrity models and actresses. He was also the host of "Derek Does Stuff With A Friend," which was a web series where he invited friends like Nicole Richie, Katy Perry, Liza Koshy, Victoria Beckham, and Chrissy Teigen to perform unexpected tasts, often surprising fans.<https://www.youtube.com/playlist?list=PLDW08pJTIUc34WoUSxmE3n1fmyB4vEu7P>

In April 2016, Blasberg was selected as the inaugural host of CNN International's television program, CNN Style. CNN Style covers fashion, as well as art, architecture, and design, and was created 15 years after the long-running Style with Elsa Klensch.

Blasberg joined YouTube as the social media's first ever Head of Fashion and Beauty in 2018.<https://www.businessoffashion.com/articles/news-analysis/youtube-hires-derek-blasberg-to-lead-new-fashion-and-beauty-partnerships-division/> <https://www.vogue.co.uk/article/derek-blasberg-interview-role-at-youtube> In his role, he expanded the launched YouTube's style vertical, initiated Digital Fashion Weeks when it wasn't safe to travel for runway shows, and helped "turned digital creators into bonafide fashion stars and supermodels into talk show hosts." <https://www.instagram.com/p/CgUjVV8LjCg/> During the Covid lockdown, he was the producer of Naomi Campbell's web series Being Naomi, exclusively on YouTube.

Blasberg was the Media and Culture consultant on all four seasons of Succession on HBO.

=== Style consultant ===
By 2006, Blasberg's presence on the guest list for many celebrity events attracted the attention of The New York Times, who profiled him as part of a possibly new phenomenon, "the male socialite."

As a fashion editor, Blasberg has collaborated with David Bailey, Terry Richardson and Marilyn Minter. Blasberg has worked as a consultant on creative projects for fashion brands such as Tiffany's. He had his own Opening Ceremony stationery line, the "Handwritten Letter Helper," and provided etiquette tips for correspondence.

Blasberg has his own line of greeting cards and invitations with Paperless Post. It launched in 2013 with a hotwings and champagne-themed party at Hogs and Heifers with guests that included Alexa Chung, Courtney Love, Lily Aldridge, and Karlie Kloss. <https://www.wsj.com/articles/SB10001424052702303796404579097442594237538?eafs_enabled=false>

In 2017, the famous London-based nightclub Annabel's asked him to update their dresscode. <https://www.gq-magazine.co.uk/article/annabels-dress-code-derek-blasberg>

== Personal life ==
Blasberg lives in New York City with his partner, Nick Brown. Brown is the co-founder and managing partner of early-stage retail tech and direct-to-consumer venture capital boutique, Imaginary Ventures. In May 2021, Blasberg and Brown welcomed twins via surrogate.

== Filmography ==
- 2010-2012: America's Next Top Model (TV series) – 2 episodes: "Patrick Demarchelier" and "Georgina Chapman"
- 2012: 24 Hour Catwalk (TV series) – Judge
- 2012: Fashion Fetish (Short film) – Concept, Script, Actor
- 2012: Sh*t Fashion Girls Say (Short film)
- 2014: The Approval Matrix (TV series) – Panelist
- 2015: Fashionably Late with Rachel Zoe (TV series)
- 2015-2016: Vanity Fair's "Conversations in the Backseat" – 2 seasons
- 2016–2018: CNN Style with Derek Blasberg (TV series)
- 2017: Odd Mom Out (TV series) – 1 episode: "M.F.A. in B.S."
- 2018: Ocean's 8

== Books ==
- Olsen, Mary-Kate; Olsen, Ashley (2008). Blasberg, Derek (ed.). Influence. New York: Razorbill. ISBN 978-1-595-14210-8. OCLC 185026578.
- Blasberg, Derek; Corral, Rodrigo (design by) (2010). Classy: Be a Lady Not a Tramp. New York: Razorbill. ISBN 978-1-595-14279-5. OCLC 428024029.
- Blasberg, Derek; Corral, Rodrigo (design by) (2011). Very Classy: Be a Lady Not a Tramp. New York: Razorbill. ISBN 978-1-101-56295-6. OCLC 773693658.
- Blasberg, Derek; Lagerfeld, Karl (foreword by); Bailey, Glenda (introduction by) (2015). Harper's BAZAAR: Models. New York: Abrams. ISBN 978-1-419-71786-4. OCLC 921844617.
