= Fashionably Late with Rachel Zoe =

- Genre: Talk show
- Starring: Rachel Zoe; Derek Blasberg; Rodger Berman
- Country of origin: United States
- Original language: English
- No. of seasons: 1
- No. of episodes: 8

Production
- Executive producers: Michael Rourke; Kay O'Connell; Rachel Zoe; Rodger Berman; Eli Lehrer; Mary Donahue; David Hillman
- Camera setup: Multiple
- Running time: 22 minutes
- Production company: Hudsun Media

Original release
- Network: Lifetime
- Release: September 24 – November 12, 2015

Fashionably Late with Rachel Zoe is an American fashion-themed talk show which premiered on September 24, 2015, on the Lifetime cable network, following Project Runway.

Announced in July 2015, the weekly series features celebrity fashion stylist Rachel Zoe as host and focuses on "what's hot and what's not" in the fashion world. The network has ordered eight half-hour episodes. The talk show is also joined by Harper's Bazaar's editor-at-large Derek Blasberg, Zoe's husband Rodger Berman and various celebrity guests.

== Episodes ==
| No. | Title | Original release date | U.S. viewers (millions) |
|---|---|---|---|
| 1 | "I Can't Even with The Emmys and Jessica Alba" | September 24, 2015 | 0.513 |
| 2 | "Totes Norms with Molly Sims and Man Braids" | October 1, 2015 | 0.599 |
| 3 | "Squad Dressing with Nicole Richie" | October 8, 2015 | 0.516 |
| 4 | "Baazar Models" | October 15, 2015 | 0.558 |
| 5 | "Reese's Pieces" | October 22, 2015 | 0.789 |
| 6 | "Right off the Runway" | October 29, 2015 | 0.867 |
| 7 | "Runway Reveal with Kelly Osbourne" | November 5, 2015 | 0.833 |
| 8 | "Beauty Queens With Eva Longoria" | November 12, 2015 | TBA |
