= Brad Goreski =

Canadian television personality (born 1977)

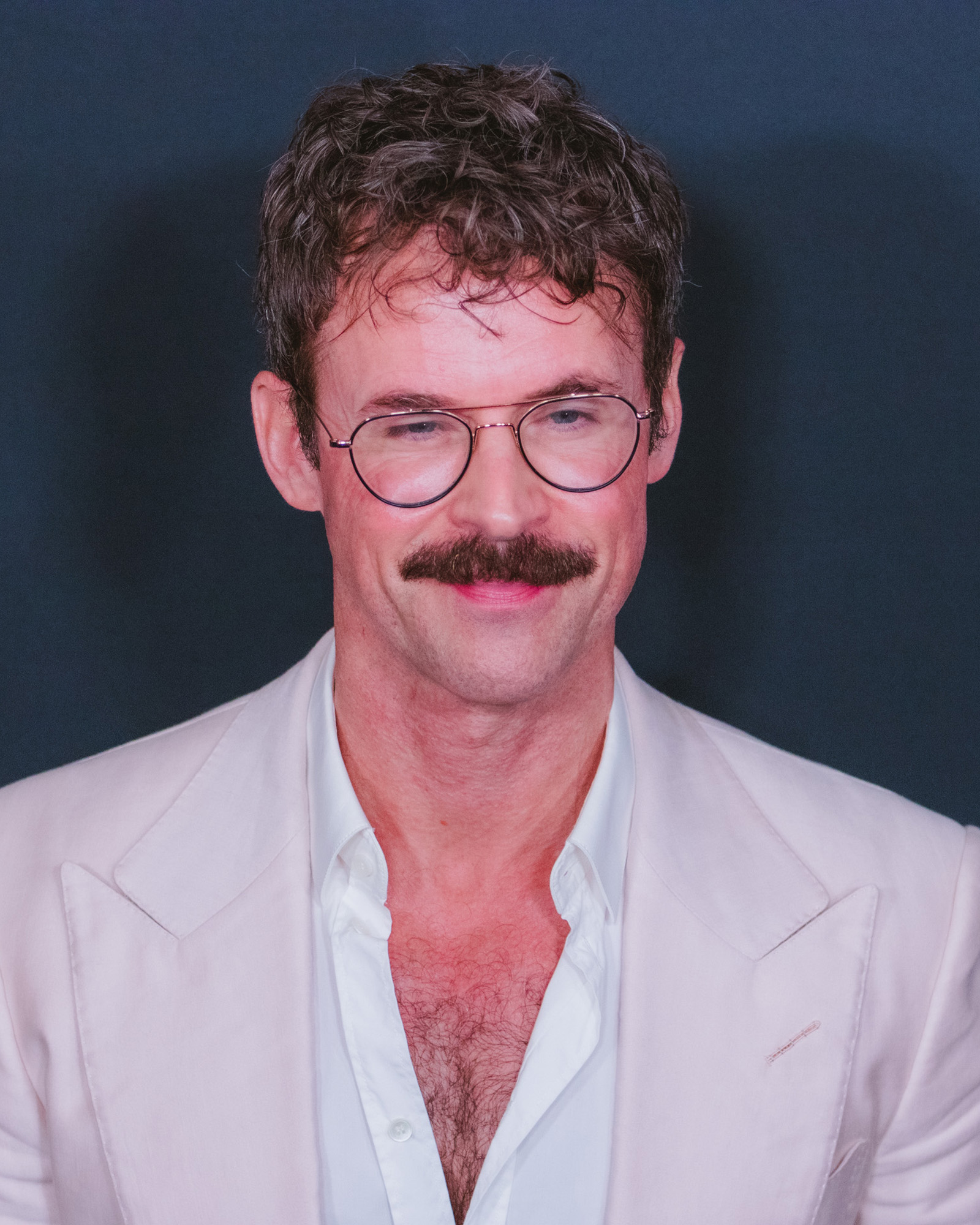
- Goreski in 2026
- Born: August 15, 1977 (age 49); Port Perry, Ontario, Canada
- Occupations: Fashion stylist and television personality
- Known for: The Rachel Zoe Project; It's a Brad, Brad World; Fashion Police; Canada's Drag Race
- Spouse: Gary Janetti (m. 2017)
- Website: www.mrbradgoreski.com

Brad Goreski (born August 15, 1977) is a Canadian-American celebrity fashion stylist and television personality. He first gained prominence in 2008, as Rachel Zoe's assistant on the Rachel Zoe Project. In 2015, he joined Fashion Police as a co-host. From 2021 to 2024, he was one of the regular judges on Canada's Drag Race.

== Career ==
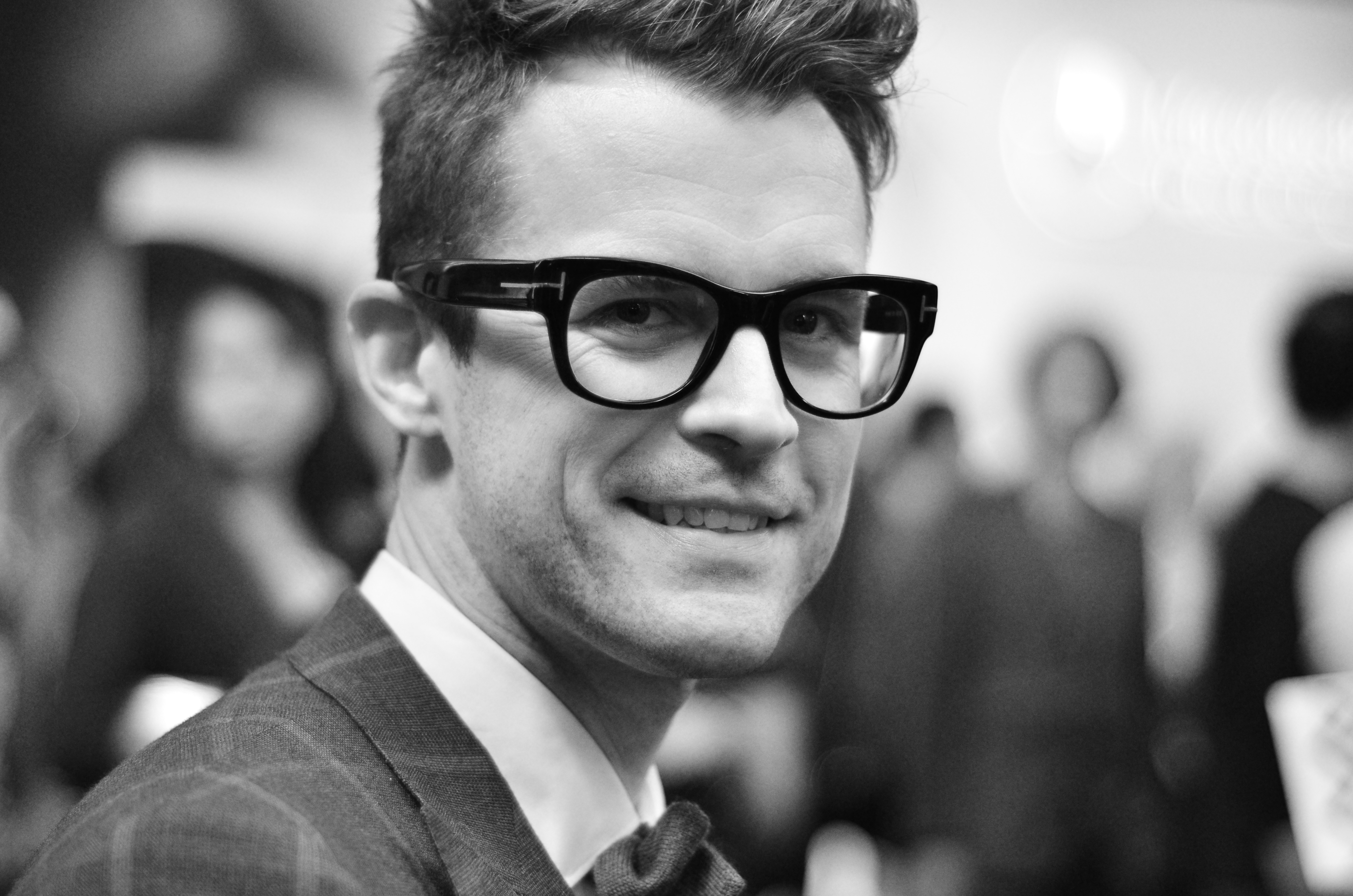
Goreski at the Mercedes-Benz Fashion Week September 2011

Goreski moved to Los Angeles from Canada in 2003 and studied art history at the University of Southern California. He graduated from USC in 2007 with a Bachelor of Arts degree. He interned at Vogue and W magazines in New York during college. As soon as he graduated, Goreski joined Vogue's west coast staff as an assistant.

In 2008, Goreski appeared on the Rachel Zoe Project as celebrity clothing stylist Rachel Zoe's assistant. In 2010 at age 33, he had a falling out with Zoe and struck out on his own to work as a wardrobe stylist. Goreski has worked with clients such as Kaley Cuoco, Demi Moore, Rashida Jones, Lea Michele, Keri Hilson and Shay Mitchell.

On January 12, 2012, Goreski premiered his own reality TV show on the Bravo network called It's a Brad, Brad World. The show ran for two seasons. In 2014, Goreski was named a new co-host of Fashion Police on the E! Network.

In June 2021, it was announced that Goreski would join the panel of Canada's Drag Race as a main judge, replacing Jeffrey Bowyer-Chapman and Stacey McKenzie, who announced their departures in March and June 2021, respectively.

== Personal life ==
In 2017 Goreski married his partner, American television writer, producer, and actor Gary Janetti.

== Filmography ==
Year	Title	Notes
2008–2010	The Rachel Zoe Project	Himself
2012–2013	It's a Brad, Brad World	Himself
2012	Miss Universe 2012	Judge
2013–2014	Family Guy	Voice (2 episodes)
2014	The Comeback	Himself (2 episodes)
2015–2017	Fashion Police	Co-host
2015	Project Runway: All Stars	Guest judge (Episode: "Once Upon a Runway")
2017	2 Broke Girls	Himself (Episode: "And 2 Broke Girls: The Movie")
2021–2024	Canada's Drag Race	Judge; Season 2, Season 3, Season 4 and Season 5
2021	The Prince	Himself (voice)
2022–2024	Canada's Drag Race: Canada vs. the World	Judge
2023	The Real Friends of WeHo	Himself

== Published works ==
- Goreski, Brad (2012). Born to Be Brad: My Life and Style. It Books. ISBN 978-0062125378.

== Awards and nominations ==
Year	Award	Category	Work	Results	Ref.
2022	Canadian Screen Awards	Best Host or Presenter, Factual or Reality/Competition (Shared with Brooke Lynn Hytes, Amanda Brugel, and Traci Melchor)	Canada's Drag Race	Won	
2023	Canadian Screen Awards	Best Host or Presenter, Factual or Reality/Competition (Shared with Brooke Lynn Hytes and Traci Melchor)	Canada's Drag Race	Won	
2024	Canadian Screen Awards	Best Host or presenter, factual or reality/competition	Canada's Drag Race: Canada vs. the World	Won	
2025	Canadian Screen Awards	Best Host in a variety, lifestyle, reality/competition, or talk program or series	Canada's Drag Race	Won	
2026	Canadian Screen Awards	Best Host or presenter, factual or reality/competition	Canada's Drag Race	Won	
