= Philip Voss =

British actor (1936–2020)

- Born: Philip James Voss; 20 August 1936; Leicester, Leicestershire, England
- Died: 13 November 2020 (aged 84); Watford, Hertfordshire, England
- Occupation: Actor
- Years active: 1963–2016
- Partner: John Peacock (died 2017)

Philip James Voss (20 August 1936 – 13 November 2020) was a British stage, radio, film and television actor.

== Early life ==
Voss was born to pharmacist James Voss and his wife, Viola (née Walmsley) in Leicester. He had a younger brother, John. When he and his family moved to the village of Wollaton, near Nottingham, he attended Nottingham High Pavement Grammar School. He joined a local amateur theatre and, after national service with the RAF, trained for the stage at RADA.

== Career ==
Voss played roles in the Doctor Who serials Marco Polo and The Dominators, Frankenstein and the Monster from Hell, the 1981 Lord of the Rings radio series, Indian Summer, an RSC 1996 revival of The White Devil, The Brides in the Bath, two plays in the Arkangel Shakespeare and a small role in an audio dramatisation of an Anton Chekhov short story. He also played recurring roles in the TV series Fish as Ivan Vishnevski and Vicious as Ian McKellen's cynical brother Mason Thornhill.

Other credits include a stint at the London Shakespeare Workout, two roles for the Shared Experience Company (in Three Sisters and The Seagull), and playing Serebryakov in a West End rendition of Anton Chekhov's The Wood Daemon. At the RSC during the 1990s, he played Menenius in Coriolanus, Sir Epicure Mammon in Ben Jonson’s The Alchemist, Ulysses in Troilus and Cressida, Malvolio in Twelfth Night, Shylock in The Merchant of Venice, and Prospero in The Tempest.

== Personal life and death ==
From the 1970s onwards, Voss lived in Bushey, Hertfordshire, with his partner, writer John Peacock. They entered into a civil partnership in 2006, and remained together until Peacock’s death in 2017. Voss died from cancer and complications of COVID-19 in Watford, Hertfordshire, on 13 November 2020, aged 84.

== Filmography ==
=== Film ===
Year	Title	Role	Notes
1974	Frankenstein and the Monster from Hell	Ernst	
1980	Hopscotch	Helicopter Pilot	Wrong Philip Voss
1983	Octopussy	Auctioneer	
1986	Lady Jane	Herald	
1986	Clockwise	Headmaster #9	
1990	Mountains of the Moon	Colonel Rigby	
1992	Northern Crescent	Education Chief	
1993	The Secret Rapture	Civil Servant	
1994	Four Weddings and a Funeral	Laura's Father - Wedding One	
1996	Indian Summer	Duncan	
2013	About Time	Theatre Judge	

=== Television ===
Year	Title	Role	Notes
1963	Suspense	Randolph Yerbray	Season 2, episode 31: "The White Hot Coal"
1963	Maupassant	Belloncle	Season 1, episode 10: "Bachelors"
1964	No Hiding Place	Jaroslav Konowski	Season 6, episode 2: "Who Takes the Blame?"
1964 1968	Doctor Who	Acomat Wahed	Season 1: "Marco Polo" (3 episodes) Season 6, episode 1: "The Dominators: episode 1"
1965	Out of the Unknown	Police Officer	Season 1, episode 5: "Time in Advance"
1967	Theatre 625	Piotr Ollendorf	Season 4, episode 15 "Hotel Torpe"
1968	Virgin of the Secret Service	Captain Nigel Bratby	Season 1, episode 6: |"The Rajah and the Suffragette"
1970	The Troubleshooters	Bosun	Season 6, episode 1: "The Slick and the Dread"
1971	Elizabeth R	King Richard	TV mini-series
1972	Crime of Passion	Chief Inspector Marsan	Season 3, episode 11: "Baptiste"
1974	Dial M for Murder	Inspector	Season 1, episode 13: "Recording Angel"
1974	Melissa	Detective Chief Inspector Carter	Season 1: (3 episodes)
1975	Raffles	Albany Manager	Season 1, episode 1: "The Amateur Cracksman"
1977	Jubilee	Newsreader	Season 1, episode 4: "Nanny's Boy"
1978	Lillie	Edward Carson	Season 1, episode 11: "Mr. Jersey"
1980	Crossroads	Raymond Hilier	Season 1, episode 3254
1980	Spy!	Solms	Season 1, episode 5: "The Venlo Incident"
1980	Lady Killers	Auguste de Mean	Season 1, episode 6: "Miss Madeleine Smith"
1980	Escape	Unknown	Season 1, episode 2: "Hijack to Mogadishu"
1983	Pig in the Middle	Police Inspector	Season 3: (2 episodes)
1983	Goodnight and God Bless	George	Season 1, episode 3: "Did You Hear the One About?"
1985	C.A.T.S. Eyes	Mr. Jenkins	Season 1, episode 11: "Fingers"
1985	Shine on Harvey Moon	Vicar	Season 4, episode 2: "Anything Goes"
1985	Me and the Girls	Professor Lembach	TV movie
1986	Murrow	Censor	TV movie
1987	Inspector Morse	Coroner	Season 1: (2 episodes)
1987	Floodtide	Vicar	TV mini-series
1994	The Dwelling Place	Cunnimgham	Season 1: (3 episodes)
1994	Shakespeare: The Animated Tales	Shepard Judge	Season 2, episode 5: "The Winter's Tale"
1995	A Village Affair	Richard Jordan	TV movie
1995	Boon	Jeremy Walters	Season 7, episode 14: "Thieves Like Us"
1996	Testament: The Bible in Animation	Lord Potiphar Judge	Season 1, episode 7: "Joseph"
1996	A Royal Scandal	Sir Robert Gifford	TV movie
1999	Where the Heart Is	Gerald Webster	Season 3, episode 14: "The Letter"
1999	Let Them Eat Cake	Physician	Season 1, episode 1: "The Pox"
2000	In Motion	Narrator	TV short
2000	Fish	Ivan Vishnevski	Season 1: (6 episodes)
2000	Trial & Retribution	Lord Justice Henry Bradpiece	Season 4, episode 2
2000	North Square	Judge Christopher Darling	Season 1, episode 1
2000	Second Sight: Hide and Seek	David Ingham	TV movie
2002	Dinotopia	Cortez	Season 1, episode 3: "Handful of Dust"
2003	The Brides in the Bath	Mr. Justice Scrutton	TV movie
2011	Law & Order: UK	Justice Reynolds	Season 6, episode 5: "Line Up"
2013–2016	Vicious	Mason Thornhill	Season 1: (4 episodes) / Season 2: (6 episodes)

=== Theatre ===
- Ivanov as Shabelsky, Director Trevor Nunn, National Theatre
- Love's Labour Lost as Boyet, Director Trevor Nunn, National Theatre
- As You Like It as Jaques, Director Peter Hall, Theatre Royal Bath/USA
- The Royal Hunt of the Sun as Miguel Estete, National Theatre
- Uncle Vanya as Alexandr Vladmiirovich Serebryakov, Director Hugh Fraser, Wilton's Music Hall
- The Giant as Lodovico/Soderini, Director Gregory Doran, Hampstead Theatre
- The Circle as Lord Porteous, Director Joanthan Church, Chichester Festival Theatre
- Apologia as Hugh, Director Josie Rourke, Bush Theatre
- Canary (2010) as Older Tom, Director Hettie MacDonald, Liverpool Everyman

=== Radio ===
- Aspects of Love as Sir George, BBC Radio
- The Lord of the Rings as the Lord of the Nazgûl, BBC Radio
- Tulips in Winter as Rabbi Menasseh Ben Israel, BBC Radio
