= The Prince (TV series) =

American-British animated sitcom TV series

- Genre: Adult animation; Animated sitcom
- Created by: Gary Janetti
- Composer: Rupert Gregson-Williams
- Countries of origin: United States; United Kingdom
- Original language: English
- No. of seasons: 1
- No. of episodes: 12

Production
- Executive producer: Gary Janetti
- Producer: Eli Dolleman
- Running time: 12–14 minutes
- Production companies: Nickleby, Inc.; 20th Television

Original release
- Network: HBO Max
- Release: July 29, 2021

The Prince is an American animated sitcom created by Gary Janetti for HBO Max. Originally slated for a late spring 2021 date, HBO Max announced on May 9, 2021, that the series would be delayed due to Prince Philip's death in April 2021. The series premiered on July 29, 2021. In February 2022, HBO Max cancelled the series after one season.

== Plot ==
The Prince focuses on an eight-year-old Prince George who makes life hard for his family and the British monarchy.

== Cast ==
- Gary Janetti as Prince George of Cambridge
- Orlando Bloom as Prince Harry, Duke of Sussex
- Condola Rashad as Meghan, Duchess of Sussex
- Lucy Punch as Catherine, Duchess of Cambridge
- Alan Cumming as Owen
- Frances de la Tour as Elizabeth II
- Iwan Rheon as William, Duke of Cambridge
- Sophie Turner as Princess Charlotte of Cambridge
- Paul Anderson as Prince Louis of Cambridge
- Dan Stevens as Charles, Prince of Wales and Prince Philip, Duke of Edinburgh

Camilla, Duchess of Cornwall, is present but has no dialogue except for a single line played as a joke ("Whoo...it's hot!") in Episode 11.

== Episodes ==
No.	Title	Directed by	Written by	Original release date	Prod. code
1	"Unfollow"	Paul Scarlata	Gary Janetti	July 29, 2021	1DGE02
Prince George turns to his butler Owen for advice upon discovering that Kelly Ripa does not follow him on social media, pressuring his great-grandmother Queen Elizabeth to arrange a ceremony in Ripa's honour.
2	"Tea"	Marius Alecse	Gary Janetti	July 29, 2021	1DGE03
The Buckingham palace staff scramble to please Queen Elizabeth when she tires of eating "flummery tarts", resulting in the massacre of the pastry's inbred subhuman bakers with only one escaping the slaughter. Prince George gossips about his uncle Prince Harry and his wife Meghan, who are struggling to make it on their own in Los Angeles.
3	"Playdate"	Steve Robertson	Alain Bala & Tom McDonald	July 29, 2021	1DGE04
Prince George's exclusive palace playdate finds him desperate to impress his friends and keeping Charlotte out of sight. In America, Harry pursues his dream job as a masseur while Meghan joins the cast of The Real Housewives of Beverly Hills.
4	"Beverly Hills"	Neil Graf	Gary Janetti	July 29, 2021	1DGE05
Meghan takes the Real Housewives cast on a trip to Buckingham Palace with Prince George making attempts of weaseling his way into a cameo.
5	"Charity"	Paul Scarlata	Alain Bala & Tom McDonald	July 29, 2021	1DGE06
As the royals prepare to host a fundraiser for an elusive cause, Prince George seeks Brad Goreski's fashion advice while Kate grows resentful of her monotonous existence. Meanwhile, the surviving creature interviews for a new position at Buckingham Palace under the name of Kevin.
6	"Vacation"	Marius Alecse & Max Martinez	Gary Janetti	July 29, 2021	1DGE07
On the royals' Caribbean vacation, Prince George enlists Owen for help taking the perfect Instagram picture.
7	"Date Night"	Steve Robertson	Alain Bala & Tom McDonald	July 29, 2021	1DGE08
Prince George has Owen work on his science fair competition. As Meghan and Harry face career blows, Kate secretly looks into building a house while Kevin returns to his ancestral home.
8	"Owen"	Neil Graf	Gary Janetti	July 29, 2021	1DGE09
Owen's attempts to enjoy simple things during his day off are interrupted by a codependent Prince George. Meanwhile, Kate reaches her breaking point as she secretly plans a divorce.
9	"School Musical" (Parts 1, 2 and 3)	Paul Scarlata	Alain Bala & Tom McDonald	July 29, 2021	1DGE10
10	"School Musical" (Parts 1, 2 and 3)	Max Martinez	Gary Janetti	July 29, 2021	1DGE11
11	"School Musical" (Parts 1, 2 and 3)	Orlando Gumatay	Gary Janetti	July 29, 2021	1DGE12
Prince George devolves into a bigger diva than usual when earning the lead role in his school's performance of Oliver Twist, though he begins to doubt if he is talented. While Queen Elizabeth considered stepping down for Prince Charles, Meghan and Harry are forced to move back into Buckingham while Owen's action to prevent Kate from divorcing William instead has them consider committing regicide. George ends up firing Owen after getting him to be honest with him, replacing him with a more coherent Kevin who intends to use his new position to destroy the House of Windsor.
12	"The Flummery Tart"	Neil Graf	Story by : Gary Janetti; Teleplay by : Alain Bala & Tom McDonald	July 29, 2021	1DGE13
As George has second thoughts over firing Owen, Kevin sees an opportunity to implement his revenge for his family when the queen suddenly requests a flummery tart and the staff panics. Kevin bakes the pastries and laces them with rat poison, killing off one of the staff members who had realized his true identity.

== Production ==
As of April 4, 2021, Janetti has released five shorts for the series on his Instagram that are not part of the actual series itself, which comment on current events and holidays, such as the pandemic, Halloween, Valentines Day, and Easter. On July 28, 2021, HBO Max announced the series would be released the next day, with 12 episodes.

On February 16, 2022, HBO Max cancelled the series after one season.

== Reception ==
The Prince received an overwhelmingly negative reception from critics, with some critics and producers calling the show unfair and inappropriate. Before the series came out, Kayleigh Donaldson of Pajiba criticized Janetti, saying that the series "lacks intent and appropriate targets."

Joel Keller of Decider urged readers to skip the series, describing it as "essentially a royal version of Family Guy, and not nearly as biting and funny".
