= Closing Numbers =

1993 British TV film

- Written by: David Cook
- Directed by: Stephen Whittaker
- Starring: Tim Woodward; Jane Asher; Jamie Glover; Frank Mills; Hazel Douglas
- Music by: Barrington Pheloung
- Country of origin: United Kingdom
- Original language: English

Production
- Producer: Jennifer Howarth
- Running time: 95 mins
- Production company: Channel Four Films

Original release
- Network: Channel 4
- Release: 2 November 1993

Closing Numbers is a 1993 Made-for-TV drama film directed by Stephen Whittaker, written by David Cook and starring Tim Woodward, Jane Asher and Jamie Glover. It was first broadcast on Channel 4 on 2 November 1993.
