= Gary Janetti =

American television writer (born 1966)

- Born: Gary Vincent Janetti; March 22, 1966 (age 60); New York City, U.S.
- Education: Hofstra University
- Occupations: Television writer; producer; actor
- Years active: 1995–present
- Notable work: Will & Grace; Family Guy; Vicious
- Spouse: Brad Goreski (m. 2017)

Gary Vincent Janetti (born March 22, 1966) is an American television writer, producer, and actor. He is best known for his work on Will & Grace, Family Guy, and Vicious.

== Career ==
Janetti has written for Family Guy, and was an executive producer on Will and Grace. He co-created and wrote the British sitcom Vicious, which aired on ITV from 2013 to 2016.

Janetti's Instagram page has gained international media attention primarily for a satirical characterization of Prince George and the child's imagined, and often catty, response to various photos and news stories about members of the British royal family. The page has more than 950,000 followers. Janetti produced a satire-animated sitcom version of Prince George called The Prince for HBO Max, in which he also provided the voice of Prince George.

Janetti's first solo nonfiction book, Do You Mind If I Cancel? (Things That Still Annoy Me), was published in October 2019, and became a New York Times Best Seller. His second is Start Without Me (I'll Be There in a Minute).

== Personal life ==
Janetti divides his time between Los Angeles and New York City. He is married to Brad Goreski.

== Filmography ==
=== Producer ===
Year	Title	Notes
1995	The Naked Truth	
1998	Style & Substance	
1999–present	Family Guy	1999 supervising producer (8 episodes) 1999–present consulting producer (220 episodes) 2011–2014 co-executive producer (44 episodes)
2000	Bette	co-executive producer, 1 episode
2001	Loomis	executive producer
2002–2006	Will & Grace	2002–2003 supervising producer (24 episodes) 2003–2005 co-executive producer (48 episodes) 2005–2006 executive producer (23 episodes)
2007	The Mastersons of Manhattan	executive producer
2013–2016	Vicious	executive producer (14 episodes)
2021	The Prince	executive producer

=== Writer ===
Year	Title	Notes
1995–1996	The Naked Truth	3 episodes
1997	Pearl	1 episode
1998	Style & Substance	2 episodes
1999–present	Family Guy	14 episodes Nominated – Writers Guild of America Award for Outstanding Writing in Animation for "Send in Stewie, Please"
2000–2001	Bette	2 episodes
2001	Loomis	
2002–2006	Will & Grace	9 episodes
2007	The Mastersons of Manhattan	
2013–2016	Vicious	created by (14 episodes) written by (14 episodes)
2021	The Prince	created by (12 episodes) written by (7 episodes) story by (1 episode)

=== Actor ===
Year	Title	Role
1997	Broadway Damage	Zola
1998	Style & Substance	Bully Delivery Guy (1 episode)
1999–present	Family Guy	voice (30 episodes)
2000–2001	Bette	Boyd / Male Flight Attendant (2 episodes)
2003	Will & Grace	Zack (1 episode, uncredited)
2012	Bunheads	Himself (2 episodes)
2012	It's a Brad, Brad World	Himself
2021	The Prince	Prince George
2025–2026	The Bear	Peter Clark (2 episodes)
2025	The Simpsons	Stylish Patron (Episode: "Aunt Misbehavin'")

== Bibliography ==
- Do You Mind If I Cancel? (Things That Still Annoy Me) (2019)
- Start Without Me (I'll Be There in a Minute) (2022)
- We Are Experiencing A Slight Delay (2024)
