= Vicious (TV series) =

British television sitcom (2013–2016)

- Genre: Sitcom
- Created by: Mark Ravenhill; Gary Janetti
- Written by: Gary Janetti
- Directed by: Ed Bye
- Starring: Derek Jacobi; Ian McKellen; Frances de la Tour; Iwan Rheon; Marcia Warren; Philip Voss
- Opening theme: "Never Can Say Goodbye" performed by the Communards
- Country of origin: United Kingdom
- Original language: English
- No. of series: 2
- No. of episodes: 14 (Note: Including specials.)

Production
- Executive producers: Jane Featherstone; Gary Janetti
- Producer: Gary Reich
- Production location: The London Studios
- Editors: Chris Wadsworth; Mark Wybourne
- Running time: 22 minutes
- Production companies: Brown Eyed Boy; Kudos; Bartleby Inc.

Original release
- Network: ITV
- Release: 29 April 2013 – 16 December 2016

Vicious is a British television sitcom created by Mark Ravenhill and Gary Janetti. Ian McKellen and Derek Jacobi star as Freddie and Stuart, an elderly gay couple who have been together for 50 years but endure a love–hate relationship. Frances de la Tour, Iwan Rheon, Marcia Warren, and Philip Voss also star as their circle of friends.

The series premiered on ITV on 29 April 2013, and aired in the United States on PBS.

== Series overview ==
Vicious is set around the lives of partners Freddie and Stuart, an aging gay couple in a Covent Garden flat with their elderly dog Balthazar. Freddie was a struggling actor and Stuart worked in a bar when they first met, but the latter has retired and now manages the household while Freddie still takes acting jobs occasionally and waits for his unlikely breakthrough. But over their 48-year relationship, the couple have developed a love/hate relationship of hurling insulting, spiteful remarks with underlying compassion and loyalty. They frequently host their friends — Violet, Penelope, and Mason — while hurling antagonising comments towards each other and their friends, and making sure that their dog is still breathing.

== Cast and characters ==
(back row), Violet (Frances de la Tour), Ash (Iwan Rheon), Mason (Philip Voss), (front row) Freddie (Ian McKellen), Stuart (Derek Jacobi), and Penelope (Marcia Warren)

- Ian McKellen as Freddie Thornhill, the sarcastically witty, theatrical, and vain partner of Stuart for 48 years. Originally from Wigan (like McKellen in real life), Freddie is an actor with intermittent success who fancies his career holding more success than it truly is with bit roles on Downton Abbey and Call the Midwife. Although he spends most his time hurling insults at others, Freddie also holds deep insecurities and demonstrates a more vulnerable side with Ash, whom he and Stuart forge a paternalistic relationship with. After becoming engaged following 49 years together — and a brief split after Freddie lies about getting an acting job that they need to fund the ceremony — Freddie and Stuart wed in the series two finale.
- Derek Jacobi as Stuart Bixby, the flamboyant, mild-mannered yet razor-sharp partner of Freddie for 48 years. Originally from Leytonstone (like Jacobi in real life), and having managed a bar at some point years earlier, Stuart dutifully manages the household with routine and social formality. He can nonetheless easily match Freddie's snarly insults, and hurl snide remarks to their friends just as easily. Initially attracted to the much younger Ash upon meeting him, both he and Freddie form a paternalistic bond with him and integrate them into their social circle. He has a close relationship with his mother — whom he did not tell of his sexuality or of his relationship until the series one finale — and is distraught when she dies at his wedding to Freddie.
- Frances de la Tour as Violet Crosby, the couple's outgoing, cheerfully boisterous friend of many years. Just as outspoken and blunt as the group, Violet often displays promiscuous behavior — particularly toward the younger Ash — that highlights her misfortunate romantic choices, such as her marriage to the low-life Jasper in series two. While sometimes making coarse or aggressive remarks about Violet, Freddie and Stuart do actually care for her well-being, such as when she is fleeced by her internet boyfriend Ignacio in Argentina and the elongated absence of her low-life husband Jasper, whom she decides to divorce when he makes a scene at Freddie and Stuart's wedding.
- Iwan Rheon as Ashley “Ash” Weston, Freddie and Stuart's friendly, grounded new upstairs neighbor in his twenties. Coming from a troubled background — both his parents are mentioned to be imprisoned — Ash forms a father-son bond with the couple and sees them as role models. He quickly integrates himself into the couple's social group, becoming the target of aggressive romantic attention from Violet, and demonstrates protectiveness of the couple and jealousy of anyone who threatens to supplant his placement in their lives. In the finale, Ash is offered a four-year grant scholarship for a New York university and accepts it at the behest of Freddie and Stuart, reluctantly saying good-bye to them.
- Marcia Warren as Penelope, the eccentric longtime friend of Freddie and Stuart. Penelope appears to be suffering from senile dementia — often forgetting basic things such as where she is or why she is there — but it is also hinted that she sometimes exaggerates her condition to handle the spitefulness and eccentricity of her friends. She demonstrates a sharp tongue and insightfulness in her lucid moments, often appearing at inopportune moments. She is very close with Mason, and had a one-night stand with Stuart before the latter realized his sexuality.
- Philip Voss as Mason Thornhill, Freddie's cynical, aloof brother. Just as acid-tongued as his brother, Mason often expresses cynical commentary at Freddie and Stuart's relationship, as well as ongoing events, while rarely showing compassion for anyone except Penelope, whom he is always with. He and Freddie's relation is barely mentioned on the show — only revealed in the series two finale — while he is also gay, not mentioned until the finale special.

=== Guest cast ===
Series 1

- Alexandra Roach as Chloe, the quirky vegan girlfriend of Ash. Despite her seemingly squeaky clean relationship with Ash, the cracks begin to show at a dinner party held by Ash's neighbours Freddie and Stuart, as she continually witnesses Freddie and Stuart and becomes increasingly drunk. Eventually, she mouths off at Freddie, who is defended by Stuart, who then orders Chloe to leave. She and Ash later break up.
- Hazel Douglas as Mildred. Mildred is the mother of Stuart, who frequently chats to her on the phone not out of choice, but necessity. She has no idea of Stuart's relationship with Freddie, despite the fact that they have lived together for nearly 50 years, and not only that, she is constantly vying for grandchildren from Stuart. Eventually, when Stuart's upstairs neighbour Ash accidentally invites Mildred to Freddie and Stuart's anniversary party, Stuart chooses to come out to her, causing her to collapse. She thankfully recovers, and accepts Freddie and Stuart's relationship.

Series 2

- Georgia King as Jess. Jess is Ash's new girlfriend, and while Ash tries to introduce her to his surrogate family, the introduction turns weird as everyone appears to be playing a part. After the whole facade is dropped, Ash introduces Jess officially to his father-figure Freddie and his partner Stuart, and their friends Violet, Penelope, and Mason. Jess settles well into Ash's circle, and when they go to ballroom dancing classes, the whole group tags along. Freddie gives Ash his mother's wedding ring to propose to Jess with. However, Jess turns Ash down because she doesn't love him. Freddie later uses the same ring to propose to Stuart.
- Celia Imrie as Lilian. Lilian is Violet's wealthy sister, and they do not share a good relationship because Lilian constantly looks down upon Violet. Violet lies to Lilian that she too has become rich after marrying Jasper. In reality, Violet and Jasper are estranged. Violet's good friends come together when Lilian drops by to spend time with her, with Stuart playing Jasper, and Stuart's partner Freddie playing a butler. The plan is very nearly ruined when Violet, Stuart, and Freddie's friend Ash comes for a visit with his girlfriend Jess, but they pass Ash off as "Jasper"'s son from a previous marriage. Lilian confesses to Violet that her husband is actually dead and that she is flat broke. A hypocritical Violet then orders Lilian to leave, and as such, Lilian never discovers Violet's true circumstances.
- Jack Ashton as Theo. Theo is an instructor at Ash's local gym, who attempts to con money out of Ash's parent figures Freddie and Stuart in exchange for grueling fitness classes. Theo and his own boyfriend get close to Freddie and Stuart, until Ash warns Theo to leave them alone by threatening to tell people that Theo is five years older than he says he is. After this, Theo stays away from Freddie and Stuart.
- Alexandra Roach as Chloe. Chloe is Ash's ex-girlfriend, first introduced in Series 1, who returns as Freddie and Stuart's wedding planner. Chloe appears to have her alcoholism and hypertension under control now, but becomes stressed when Stuart keeps putting her under pressure by coming with grander and costlier ideas for the wedding, even if it meant Chloe paying the happy couple money, and not vice versa. Freddie and Stuart unexpectedly break up at their joint stag-do, much to Chloe's relief.
- Samuel Barnett as Young Stuart. When Stuart reminisces about when he and Freddie first moved into their apartment, the reason behind their unique relationship is revealed, as Stuart is shown to apparently be a bad tea-maker. They have their first argument, spitting insults at each other, after which they promise to never do so again, a promise which is quickly broken.
- Luke Treadaway as Young Freddie. When Stuart reminisces about when he and Freddie first moved into their apartment, the reason behind their unique relationship is revealed, as Freddie is shown to be a pushover. After the couple spout insults at each other during their first argument, they pledge to never do so ever again, but this breaks down as soon as it is made.
- Michael Cochrane as Jasper. Jasper is the low-life new husband of Violet. Jasper hasn't been seen by Violet for months, during which time Violet gives up on their marriage after speaking to Jasper's six ex-wives. Jasper soon reappears, and is shown to be using Violet as a cash machine and punching bag. At the wedding of Violet's friends, Freddie and Stuart, Jasper oversteps the mark, and gets punched by their other friend Ash. Jasper and Violet later get divorced.
- Frances Barber as Carlotta. After Violet becomes a lesbian in the Finale special, Carlotta is introduced as her new girlfriend. Carlotta appears to be more "involved" in the relationship than Violet, and is very raunchy with her. Eventually, Violet finds a way to wriggle out of Carlotta's hold, and returns to her prior life as a promiscuous heterosexual.
- Alistair Brammer as Oliver. After Freddie and Stuart's upstairs neighbour Ash leaves for America in the Finale special, Oliver moves into Ash's old flat. He appears to be a more uptight copy of Ash, as he suddenly becomes the subject of the affections of Violet, who previously was attracted to Ash.
- Richard Gadd as Delivery Man. In the finale special, this delivery man makes numerous visits to Freddie and Stuart's apartment over a whole year to deliver packages to them.

== Episodes ==
=== Series 1 (2013) ===
No. overall	No. in series	Title	Original release date	Viewers (millions)
1	1	"Wake"	29 April 2013	5.78
Freddie and Stuart host a wake to mark the passing of an old friend. Joined by their small circle of elderly friends, the couple manage to create a splendidly awkward evening of very little food and biting insults. They are also joined by their young new neighbour Ash, who spends the evening attempting to be a good guest whilst fending off the advances of Freddie and Stuart's best friend Violet.
2	2	"Shopping"	6 May 2013	3.82
New neighbour Ash seeks advice from them on winning back his ex-girlfriend, and Violet and Penelope take Ash shopping for a gift. Spotting Stuart working in a men's outfitters, the trio suspects him of having an affair, but Stuart admits that he has taken a job because Freddie's acting career is currently not bringing in enough money. Later, Freddie goes to the shop and makes the same discovery, but pretends to believe that Stuart is having an affair because he does not want to hurt his pride. Ash tells Violet that he won his girlfriend back, but after witnessing the sacrifices of Freddie and Stuart, admires their closeness and ends his frivolous relationship.
3	3	"Audition"	13 May 2013	2.78
Freddie has an important audition coming up whilst Ash frets over his own career direction. Freddie suggests that Ash pursue acting and teaches him the tricks of the trade, only to injure his confidence when Ash immediately secures an acting role; noting Freddie's new state of depression, Stuart schemes to renew his confidence. Meanwhile, Violet seeks advice from Freddie and Stuart on her sordid love affair with her Hungarian internet boyfriend.
4	4	"Clubbing"	20 May 2013	2.55 (overnight†)
Ash invites Freddie, Stuart, Penelope and Mason to go clubbing, which Freddie and Stuart turn into a popularity contest. After becoming more popular with Ash's friends than Stuart, Freddie boasts his success, only to feel out of place due to his age. Realizing his inappropriate behaviour and selfishness, he then apologizes and makes up with Stuart. Meanwhile, Violet heads abroad to Argentina in order to meet her new online partner.
5	5	"Dinner Party"	3 June 2013	2.53
Freddie, feeling low as his acting jobs appear to be drying up, invites Ash and his vegan girlfriend Chloe (Alexandra Roach) for one of Stuart's dinner parties. Finding Chloe both naïve and irritating, Stuart and Freddie endure the young couple's saccharine behaviour, only to later relish the bickering that develops. Meanwhile, Violet visits her internet boyfriend in Argentina, only to be handcuffed and robbed of her money and passport, stranding her in South America.
6	6	"Anniversary"	10 June 2013	2.77
Freddie and Stuart are having a party to celebrate their 49th anniversary. Ash accidentally tells Stuart's mother Mildred (Hazel Douglas) about the party so Stuart decides that it is time he told her the truth about his relationship with Freddie. Freddie meanwhile attempts to invite Judi Dench, whom he worked with in a commercial 40 years ago.

=== Christmas Special (2013) ===
No. overall	No. in series	Title	Original release date	Viewers (millions)
7	7	"Christmas Special"	27 December 2013	3.15
Freddie and Stuart decide to host a traditional Christmas dinner at their flat for their friends. The only problem is that Ash is cooking, while Violet brings a new lover and Freddie has an incredibly demanding new acting gig (as Father Christmas).

=== Series 2 (2015) ===
No. overall	No. in series	Title	Original release date	Viewers (millions)
8	1	"Sister"	1 June 2015	3.00
Violet panics when her wealthy sister Lillian (Celia Imrie) — whom she has not seen in years — announces a visit. Worried that Lillian will discover the truth about her circumstances, Violet and friends set in motion an elaborate plan to save her from humiliation. Meanwhile, Ash is keen to introduce the group to his new girlfriend, Jess (Georgia King).
9	2	"Gym"	8 June 2015	2.40
Feeling unfit, Freddie and Stuart join Ash at his gym, where a young fitness instructor persuades the pair to sign up for an expensive membership. Ash becomes jealous of their new bond with the instructor, while the couple eventually discover their limitations when their ambitions get the best of them. With Freddie and Stuart spending so much time at the gym, Violet and Penelope discover how pleasant their flat can be without the bickering pair in it.
10	3	"Ballroom"	15 June 2015	2.38
When Ash and Jess (Georgia King) sign up for a ballroom dancing class, the group joins them. Freddie becomes jealous when Stuart quickly becomes teacher's pet, but his quitting the class irks Stuart. Violet becomes a hit with the amorous teacher in other ways, while Ash considers proposing to Jess. Penelope mistakes Mason for her late husband Robert, but the false relationship deteriorates as she becomes increasingly demanding. Freddie eventually returns to partner with Stuart, and after Jess dumps Ash following his marriage proposal, Freddie proposes to Stuart and they become engaged.
11	4	"Stag Do"	22 June 2015	2.25
Finding themselves both single, Violet and Ash consider dating new people. Violet has already met someone on the internet, while Ash's ex Chloe (Alexandra Roach) returns. Meanwhile, Freddie feels pressure from Stuart to land a new acting role to make money for their wedding ceremony. When Stuart discovers he lied about getting a role, the couple have a fight and break up.
12	5	"Flatmates"	29 June 2015	2.17
In the wake of Freddie and Stuart's split, and Violet and Ash's hookup, Stuart moves in upstairs with Ash, while Violet moves into the flat with Freddie since hers is being fumigated. However, as the former couple drive each of their new flatmates crazy, Violet and Ash conspire to get them back together.
13	6	"Wedding"	6 July 2015	2.06 (overnight†)
Freddie and Stuart's wedding day arrives, but with their usual brand of chaos. Mason and Penelope have problems getting the cake to the ceremony, Violet's wayward husband Jasper finally turns up to cause trouble, and Stuart's mum Mildred dies at the ceremony in Ash's arms.

=== Special (2016) ===
A one-off special, and was the show's final episode. It aired 19 June 2016 in the US, and 16 December 2016 in the UK.

No. overall	No. in series	Title	Directed by	Original release date	Viewers (millions)
14	7	"A Year"	Ben Kellett	16 December 2016	N/A
In spring, Freddie and Stuart attempt to hide their recently gained inheritance from Mildred's will. Violet has financial troubles after her recent divorce while Ash struggles to meet his rent. Signs of Freddie and Stuart’s expenditure soon threaten the pretence as their home is overrun with guests. In summer, it's Freddie's birthday party and an unexpected card arrives. Stuart prepares a very special present, while Violet announces she has "become" a lesbian with a girlfriend named Carlotta and both Ash and Penelope share a secret. In autumn, Ash arrives at Freddie and Stuart's flat with news that he is going to attend university in America, whilst in winter the gang gather round at Christmas to experience Freddie’s latest acting job.

== Broadcast ==
The first series of Vicious premiered on 29 April 2013 with 5.78 million viewers and ended on 10 June 2013 with 2.77 million viewers. The DVD of series was released on 20 November 2013. The first series premiered in the United States on various PBS stations on Sunday, 29 June 2014.

On 23 August 2013, it was confirmed that Vicious had been renewed for a second series, which began airing on 1 June 2015 and concluded on 6 July 2015. The second series began airing in the United States on PBS on 23 August 2015.

In December 2015 ITV announced the series was cancelled and would end with a special finale in 2016. The hour long series finale was recorded at a live performance on 23 December 2015 with a rehearsal the previous day, at The London Studios. The finale aired on PBS in America on 19 June 2016 and on ITV on 16 December 2016.

On 14 May 2016, McKellen and Jacobi appeared as Freddie and Stuart during the Eurovision Song Contest where they are seen watching and reacting to the contest.

== Reception ==
Vicious was met with generally positive reviews from critics. The review aggregator website Rotten Tomatoes reports an 80% "Fresh" rating based on ten reviews.

Keith Watson of Metro wrote a favourable review, calling Vicious "nostalgic fun".

Morgan Jeffery of Digital Spy wrote a mixed review, finding the show an "uncomfortable blend of coarse humour and '70s sitcom-style cosiness". Describing the script as "lazy", he thought that the show couldn't "decide if it wants to be edgy and rude or traditional fun for all the family", but praised the "strong" cast, ultimately awarding the series two out of five stars.

Kevin O'Sullivan of the Sunday Mirror called it a "horrible half-hour of 1970s-style net curtain cosiness" in a negative review of ITV's Monday night comedy offerings. In a 29 April 2013 review in the Telegraph, Benjamin Secher claimed it is "the least funny new comedy in recent memory", giving it 1 out of 5 stars. He also wrote that "the script fell disastrously flat". Writing in the London Evening Standard, Brian Sewell described the series as "a spiteful parody that could not have been nastier had it been devised and written by a malevolent and recriminatory heterosexual".

The series was twice nominated for the GLAAD Media Award for Outstanding Comedy Series while the finale was nominated for Outstanding TV Movie or Limited Series.

== DVD release ==
The first series of Vicious was released on DVD in the UK on 20 November 2013 by 4DVD. The second series was released on 13 July 2015. Neither release contains the 2013 Christmas special which remains unreleased on DVD in the UK so far, though it is available on the season 1 releases in Australia and the US. The finale special was only released on DVD in the US.
