= Rachel Zoe =

American fashion stylist (born 1971)

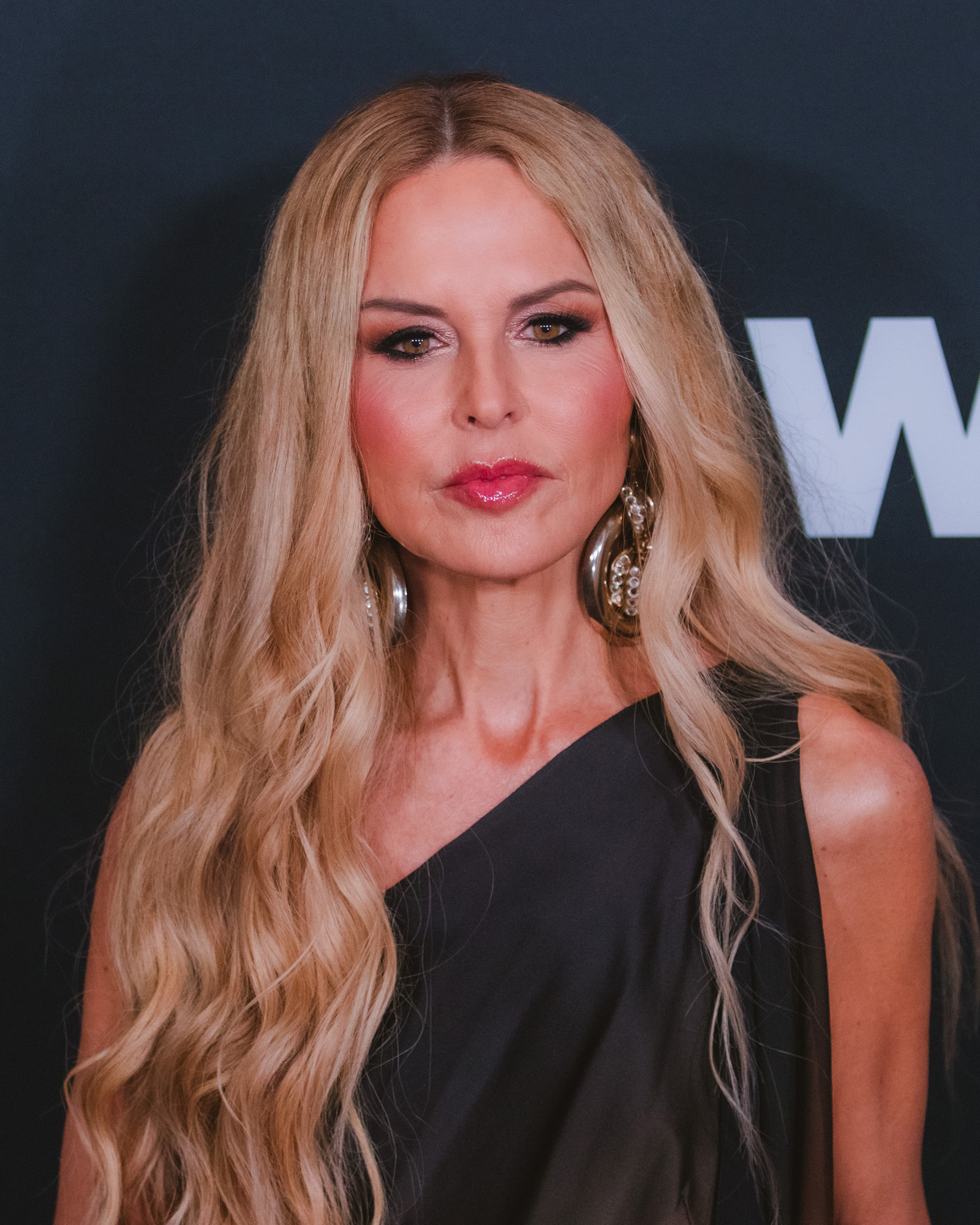
- Zoe in 2026
- Born: Rachel Zoe Rosenzweig; September 1, 1971 (age 55); New York City, U.S.
- Education: George Washington University (BS)
- Occupations: Fashion designer, stylist
- Spouse: Rodger Berman (m. 1998; div. 2025)
- Children: 2

Rachel Zoe Rosenzweig (born September 1, 1971) is an American fashion designer, businesswoman and author who worked as a celebrity wardrobe stylist. She worked around the same time as the creation of "the boho-meets-rock chic look that was popular with group of new breed Hollywood ‘it’-girls who were as adept at setting trends as they were at causing trouble" in the mid-2000s. Describing her signature look, Zoe said: "It's basically all heels and moo-moo’s. It's designed to make me look taller and I use a bunch of gold and a lot of bronze, shimmer and glamour, but relaxed glamour, very unstructured, bold accessories." Zoe's clients as a stylist have included Cameron Diaz, Kate Hudson, Kate Beckinsale, Debra Messing, Demi Moore, Liv Tyler, Joy Bryant, Molly Sims, Beau Garett, Eva Mendes, Paula Patton, Anne Hathaway, Jennifer Lawrence, Miley Cyrus, and Pauly Shore.

During the mid-2000s, Nicole Richie hired Zoe as a stylist in 2005, as well as with actresses Mischa Barton and Lindsay Lohan.

Zoe works for lifestyle brand The Zoe Report, which began as a blog which she launched in 2009. She launched her eponymous fashion brand in 2011. From 2008 until 2013, Zoe starred in the Bravo reality television series The Rachel Zoe Project, which ran for five seasons.

== Early life and education ==
She was born Rachel Zoe Rosenzweig in New York City, the daughter of art collectors Leslie and Ron Rosenzweig. Ron Rosenzweig managed two different companies. She has a sister, Pamela Rosenzweig. Zoe dropped her last name in favor of her middle when she began her career as a fashion stylist, as Rosenzweig sounded "too Jewish".

Zoe grew up in Millburn, New Jersey and graduated from Millburn High School. She studied psychology and sociology at George Washington University, where she met her future husband, Rodger Berman. After graduating, she moved to New York City to pursue a career in fashion. She later moved to Los Angeles in 2002.

== Career ==
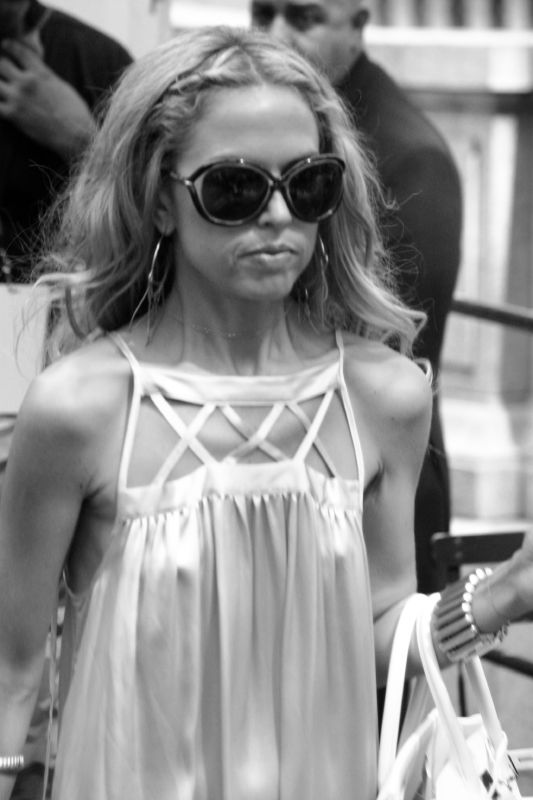
Zoe during the Mercedes-Benz Fashion Week in September 2007

=== Beginnings ===
Zoe began her career working for YM Magazine aged 22, before leaving to work as a freelance publicist after three years. She later changed her focus to fashion. Around 2002–03, Zoe worked with her "first big client", Jennifer Garner. In 2004, Zoe styled Garner for the Academy Awards, which she considers a turning point for her career as a stylist. "This was when I crossed over from the pop stars -- I realized that it was much more my style, creatively, to do the incredibly glamorous red-carpet thing."

=== 'Boho chic' and tabloid controversy (2005–06) ===
In 2005, Zoe was hired by reality TV star Nicole Richie as a stylist. Zoe's association with Richie led to tabloid coverage that elevated her profile. Zoe became known as the pioneer of the 'boho-chic' look. This look is influenced by the 1970s, consisting of oversized jewellery, loose-fitting dresses and shirts, paired with a slim frame. Those wearing the look were described as "Zoebots".

Critics accused Zoe of promoting the eating disorder anorexia nervosa, both during the height of her fame as a celebrity stylist in the mid-2000s and in retrospective work on that period: writing for Grazia in 2020 on the 2000s fashion revival of the early 2020s, Laura Antonia Jordan wrote, "The ‘zoebot’ look became inextricable from the glorification of size zero. The cartoonish proportions only served to exaggerate those jutting hipbones, spaghetti limbs and protruding clavicles."

There was also media speculation that Zoe gave clients drugs to lose weight, which she refuted in a 2007 interview with W Magazine: “There was something that came out about me giving horse pills or diet pills from Mexico to my clients.” “Anyone who knows me, they laugh. I’m so drug clueless. If I can get through a glass and a half of wine in a night, that’s a momentous occasion."

After she fired Zoe as her stylist in 2006, Richie wrote in a MySpace blog which was later deleted, "What 35-year-old raisin-face whispers her order of three pieces of asparagus for dinner at Chateau every night, and hides her deathly disorder by pointing the finger at me, and used her last paycheck I wrote her to pay for a publicist instead of a nutritionist? HINT: Her nickname is Lettucecup."

The blog was widely interpreted to be written about Zoe. In response, Zoe released a statement to TMZ: "After trying to be a good friend to Nicole, we made a mutual decision to sever our working relationship. Changes are inevitable in any business relationship. I am fortunate to have a wonderful life; I have been married for 10 years and been a stylist for 15 years. And I am lucky to work with a diverse group of women, of all shapes and sizes, that inspire me every day. I have nothing but love for Nicole and wish her only health and happiness."

=== The Rachel Zoe Project (2007–13) ===
In September 2008, Zoe's reality series, The Rachel Zoe Project, debuted on Bravo. The series' second season premiered in August 2009. Bravo announced they would be picking up a third season of the show which premiered in August 2010 and covered the departure of Zoe's longtime assistant, Taylor Jacobson, while introducing her new assistant, Ashley. The fourth season premiered in September 2011 and involved Zoe dealing with Brad Goreski's departure as well as her pregnancy with her first child. The fifth and final season aired during spring 2013, focusing on the development of her collection and other projects like blowout salon DreamDry, as well as the preparation for the release of her second book, Living in Style: Inspiration and Advice for Everyday Glamour.

=== The Zoe Report (2009–present) ===
Zoe founded a free daily newsletter called The Zoe Report in August 2009, which later grew into a lifestyle brand. The newsletter featured items that Zoe was coveting in the worlds of fashion, beauty and lifestyle, and had over 750,000 subscribers. In 2011, Zoe launched Zoe Beautiful focused on all things beauty. The Zoe Report was acquired by Bustle Digital Group in 2019.

In 2015, The Zoe Report launched Box of Style, a service that delivers a selection of Zoe-approved goods to subscribers' doorsteps four times a year. Consumers may purchase a single box for $100 or pay $350 for an annual subscription. Subscribers receive items valued at over $300 quarterly each year, including one "hero" item that retails for over $100. This special piece is revealed in advance, but all other items (which may include clothing, beauty, accessories, home or lifestyle items) are a surprise.

In July 2015, a talk show entitled Fashionably Late with Rachel Zoe was announced, with Zoe as host and focusing on "what's hot and what's not" in the fashion world. The show lasted for one season. Zoe collaborated with accessories maker Judith Leiber on a line of bags.

=== Other ventures ===
In 2007, Zoe partnered with Served as the face of Samsung's BlackJack cell phone national ad campaign.

Style A to Zoe: The Art of Fashion, Beauty and Everything Glamour, a book co-written with Rose Apodaca, was published in 2007.

In 2010, she made an appearance on Gossip Girl as herself. Zoe also appeared on VH1 reality TV show Barely Famous.

In 2012, Zoe co-launched DreamDry, a hair salon in New York City, with Robin Moraetes.

Zoe is a part of the ownership group of Angel City FC of the National Women's Soccer League.

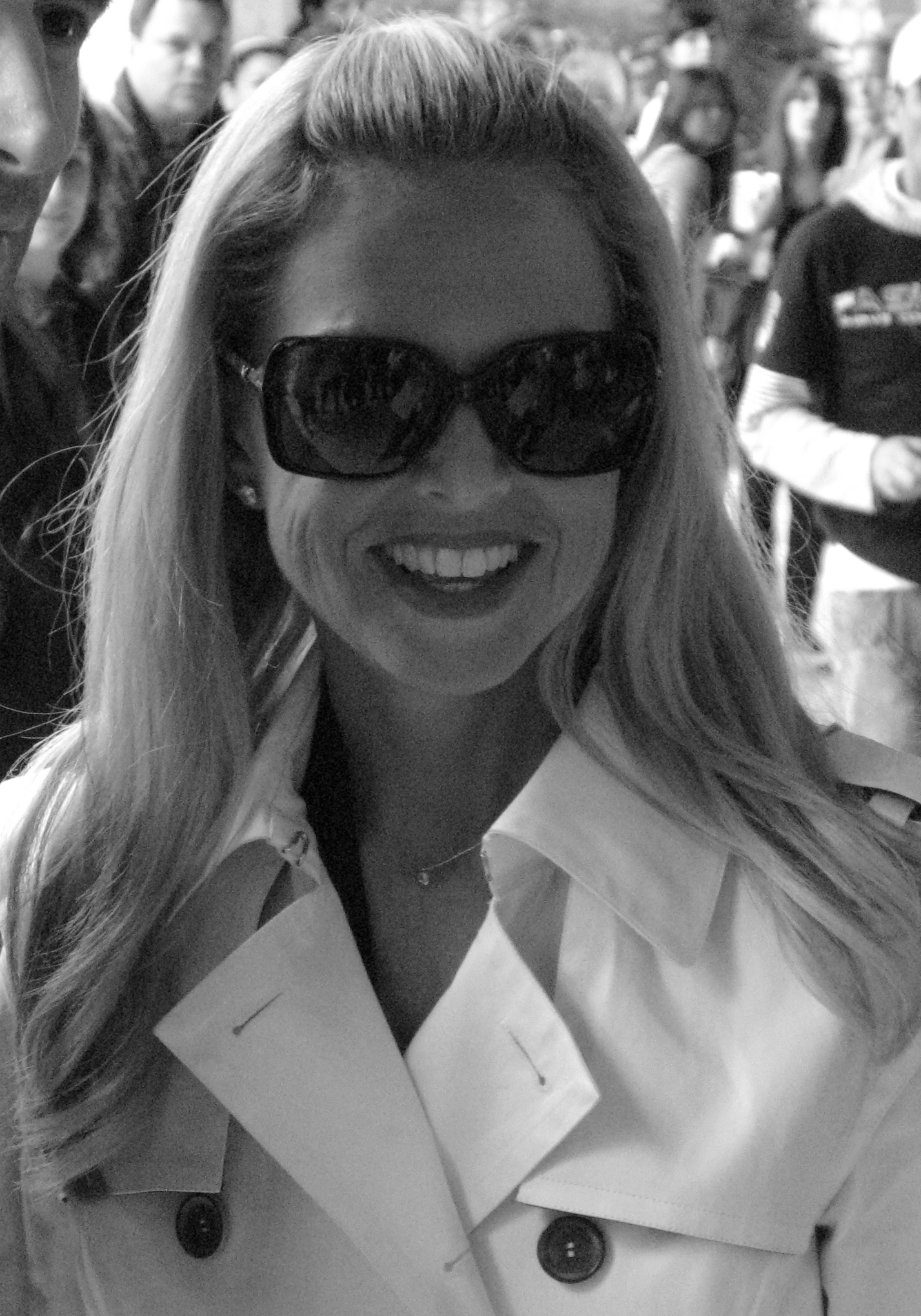
Zoe at a Diane Von Furstenberg show in September 2010

In June 2025, Zoe was announced to be joining the cast of The Real Housewives of Beverly Hills, as a full-time cast member for the fifteenth season.

=== Fashion and lifestyle design work ===
In 2011, Zoe released her first contemporary collection of separates, footwear, and handbags influenced by her vintage-inspired, 60s and 70s style. The collection was available in over 275 department stores including Bloomingdale's, Nordstrom, and Neiman Marcus. In 2012, Rachel announced her plans to expand the line to include jewelry and cold weather accessories. Zoe's brand did not participate in the 2014 New York Fashion Week.

In 2008, Zoe acted as a consultant for Piperlime.com, Gap, Inc's shoe and handbag website.

In 2009, the Luxe Rachel Zoe collection, a QVC exclusive consisting of handbags, jewelry, scarves, sunglasses, and outerwear, was announced. The line sold over 260,000 units.

In February 2011, Swedish fashion retailer Lindex announced a collaboration with Zoe, her first bigger collaboration with a European brand.

She teamed up with Quinny and Maxi-Cosi for a 2016 collection of baby strollers and car seats.

In 2019, a partnership between Zoe and Starbucks Asia Pacific was announced, with a six-piece collection of Starbucks X Rachel Zoe branded items appearing in select Starbuck stores in Asia.

== Personal life ==
Zoe met Rodger Berman in 1991, when both were attending The George Washington University in Washington, D.C. They married in 1998, and have two sons, born in March 2011 and December 2013. The family lives in Los Angeles. On September 9th 2024 it was announced that Zoe and Berman were separating. Zoe filed for divorce in July 2025.

Zoe has been the subject of media speculation because of her "superthin" frame, with some press labeling her "anorexic". In a 2008 interview with Harper's Bazaar, she said, "Truthfully, I've never seen myself as being too thin. Sometimes I'll look at photos and be like, 'Oh, that's not a good look.' But generally speaking, I'm not too thin."
