= Presidency of Artur Bernardes =

Government of the twelfth president of the republic of Brazil (1922 - 1926)

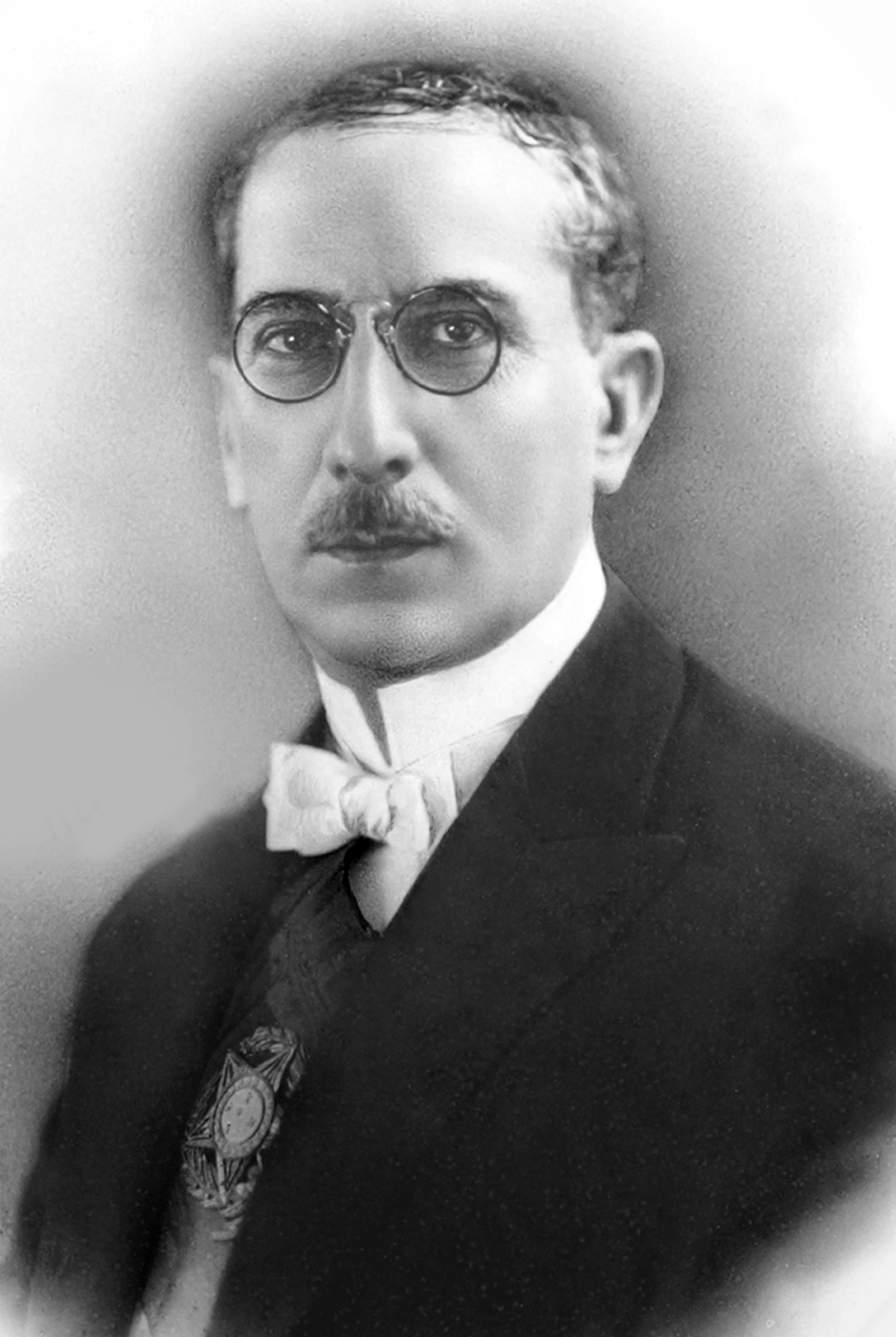
- Official portrait, 1922
- Presidency of Artur Bernardes; 15 November 1922 – 15 November 1926
- Vice President: Estácio Coimbra
- Cabinet: See list
- Party: PRM
- Election: 1922
- Seat: Catete Palace
- Standard of the President

Artur Bernardes' tenure as the 12th president of Brazil lasted from 15 November 1922, after he defeated Nilo Peçanha in the 1922 presidential election, until 15 November 1926, when he transferred power to Washington Luís. A representative of the so-called "milk coffee policy" and the last years of the First Brazilian Republic, Bernardes ruled the country almost continuously under a state of emergency, supported by the political class, rural and urban oligarchies, and high-ranking officers of the Armed Forces against a series of tenentist military revolts.

In the urban centres, especially in Rio de Janeiro, the Bernardes administration was unpopular due to the rise of inflation and currency devaluation caused by coffee valorization policies. The administration cut public spending, transformed the Bank of Brazil into an issuing bank and sought a loan from British bankers. Negotiations for the loan were unsuccessful, but many of the recommendations of the British mission of financial experts, led by Edwin Montagu, were followed. At the end of 1924, the government expelled São Paulo politicians from the direction of the country's economy, abandoned federal support for the protection of coffee and began a contractionary and recessive policy, which achieved its goals of containing inflation and exchange rates at the expense of contracting industrial output.

The federal government supported the overthrow of the dominant parties in the states that had supported Peçanha (federal intervention in Rio de Janeiro and state of emergency in Bahia) and mediated armed conflicts (1923 Revolution in Rio Grande do Sul and expeditions against Horácio de Matos in Bahia). From July 1924 until the end of Bernardes' term, conspirators in lower military ranks tried to overthrow the regime, which they considered corrupt and backward. The longest campaign, the Prestes Column, discredited the government but failed to threaten the federal capital.

Power was maintained with an iron fist: reorganization of the capital's political police (the 4th Auxiliary Police Bureau), the bombing of São Paulo, censorship of the press, closure of unions, mass arrests, torture, and exile to the penal colony of Clevelândia. With a majority in Congress, the government enacted labour laws, introduced income tax, instituted the right of reply in the press and facilitated complaints against journalists for slander and defamation, included moral and civic education in the schools' curricula and revised the 1891 Constitution with a centralizing amendment. In foreign policy, Brazil's maneuvers to obtain a permanent seat on the League of Nations' Deliberative Council culminated in the country's withdrawal from the organization.

== Background ==
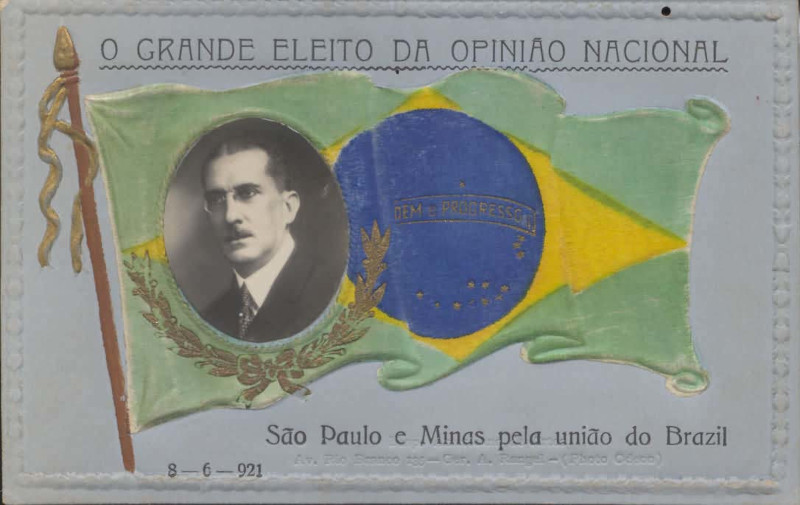
Bernardes candidacy postcard: "São Paulo and Minas [Gerais] for the union of Brazil"

The Artur Bernardes administration, between 15 November 1922 and 15 November 1926, took place in the midst of the crisis of Brazil's First or Old Republic. This was a period of cultural effervescence and expansion of the urban middle and working classes. The First Republic's political system began to show signs of exhaustion, which would culminate in its fall in 1930. The previous president's image, Epitácio Pessoa (1919–1922), was eroded among the military, the urban population and the oligarchies of Minas Gerais and São Paulo. The Brazilian economy in 1922 was growing, but suffered from high inflation, a devalued currency, (Note: "The total currency in circulation doubled between 1920 and 1923. During this period, the value of the Brazilian currency, the mil-réis, fell from 20 U.S. cents to 10 cents" (Macaulay 1977, p. 20).) eroded tax revenue and low international coffee prices, Brazil's main export product. Foreign creditors were unwilling to lend money, and the deficit could only be financed by issuing money or selling public debt bonds.

Bernardes, leader of the Republican Party of Minas Gerais, was the candidate of the federal government, Minas Gerais, and São Paulo in the 1922 presidential election, chosen in spite of other states. Rio de Janeiro, Rio Grande do Sul, Pernambuco and Bahia came together in the Republican Reaction and launched the opposition candidacies of Nilo Peçanha, from Rio de Janeiro, for president, and J. J. Seabra, from Bahia, for vice president. The campaign was fierce. The election was one of the few tightly disputed ones in the First Republic and the opposition accused the results of fraud. The Copacabana Fort revolt attempted to prevent Bernardes' inauguration and the government declared a state of emergency in response.

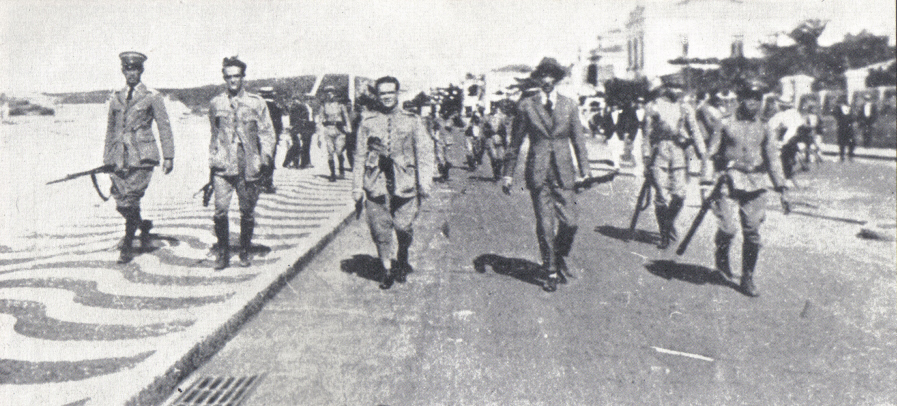
The last rebels from Fort Copacabana head into combat on 6 July

On the date of the inauguration, the state of emergency was still in force, and 118 rebellious military personnel were awaiting trial in prison. The country was divided between winners and losers. The pact between the elites was weakened. The new government began with enemies in the dissident oligarchies, urban sectors and the military. The following years would be unstable and Benardes preferred repression instead of conciliation, deepening the grievances. Historiography normally considers Bernardes to be a revanchist and vengeful ruler.

In a speech at the Senate, in 1929, Bernardes recapitulated the presidential successions of 1922 and 1926:

Isn't it still in everyone's memory how the last presidential campaign was? It was said that the candidate would not be elected; if elected, he would not be recognized; would not take office; would not cross the thresholds of the Catete Palace! However, the threats from my adversaries did not remain there. They took them further — I would not reach the second year of my government, I would not be able to place in the hands of my successor the office that the Nation had entrusted to me. However, the candidate was elected, was recognized, took office, ruled and handed over the Nation's fate to his substitutes.

== Government programme ==
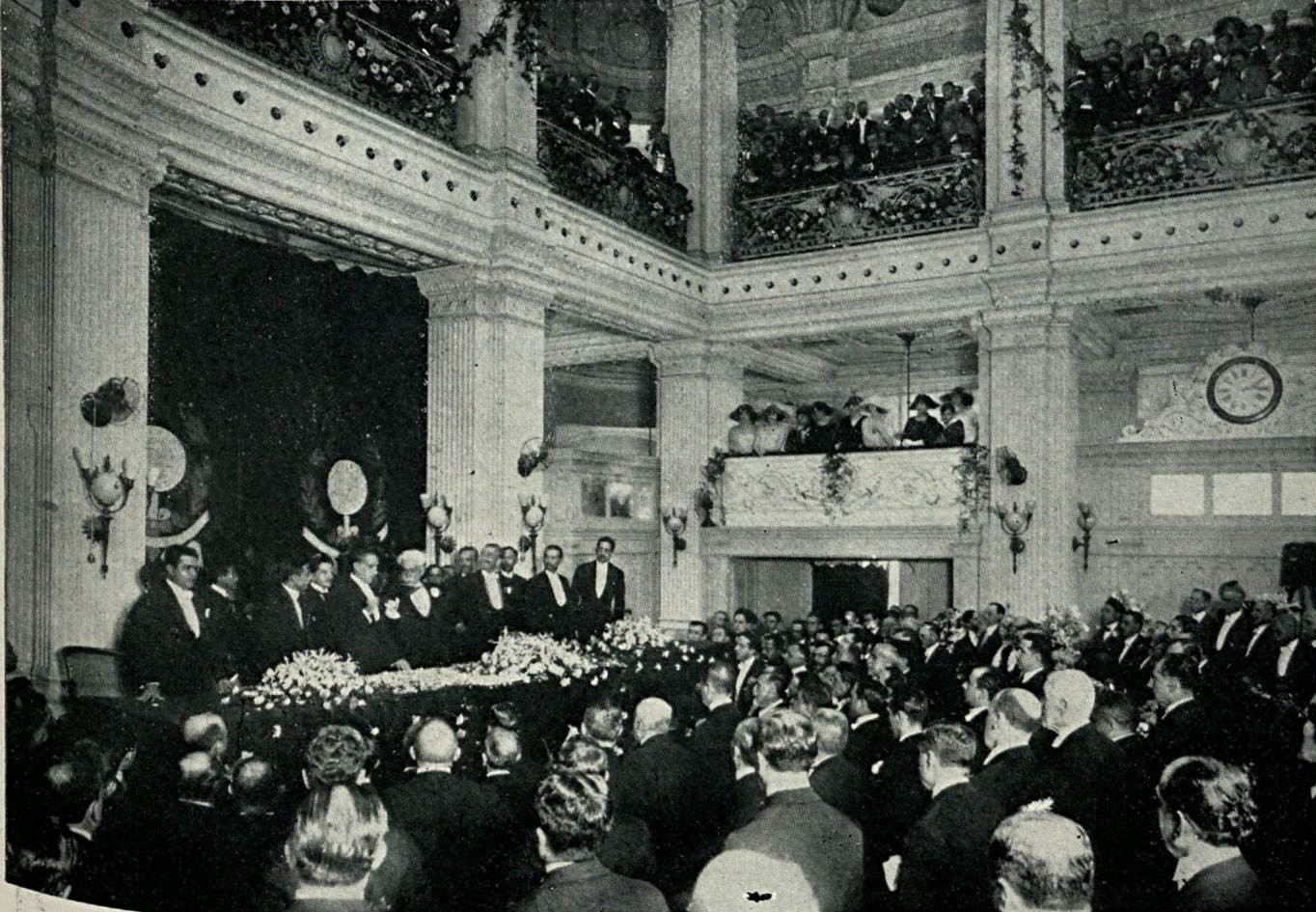
Bernardes reading the constitutional oath before Congress on 15 November 1922

Bernardes' candidacy manifesto focused on economic issues, with three goals: budget balance, currency valorization and the creation of an independent central bank. It promised to reduce the public deficit without spending cuts, just by tightening tax evaders and unauthorized treasury spending. Equilibrium in the trade balance would come from the permanent protection of coffee, the increase in other exports, such as cotton, and import substitution, especially through the development of coal production and the industrialization of iron deposits in Minas Gerais. An additional point was to solve the National Treasury's immense debt with the Bank of Brazil.

Other proposals did not differ much from Peçanha's manifesto. Both candidates vaguely denounced the degeneration of republican ideals and defended the reform of Brazil's Constitution and the expansion of public education and assistance to workers and the underprivileged. Bernardes' ideological foundations were Minas Gerais-style developmentalism along the lines of João Pinheiro's administration (1906–1908), the nationalist and authoritarian criticisms of liberalism, a strong Executive and a voluntarist and dirigiste State, in order to produce a conservative modernization.

== 1922 ==
=== Cabinet ===
The Bernardes cabinet
Office	Name	Term
Justice and Internal Affairs	João Luís Alves	1922 – 1925
Afonso Pena Júnior	1925 – 1926
Navy	Alexandrino Faria de Alencar	1922 – 1926
Arnaldo Pinto da Luz	1926 – 1926
War	Setembrino de Carvalho	1922 – 1926
Foreign Affairs	Félix Pacheco	1922 – 1926
Finance	Sampaio Vidal	1922 – 1925
Aníbal Freire	1925 – 1926
Transport and Public Works	Francisco Sá	1922 – 1926
Agriculture	Miguel Calmon	1922 – 1926

State ministers were chosen since the beginning of October and represented almost total support among civilian politicians. São Paulo native Rafael de Abreu Sampaio Vidal took over the Ministry of Finance, ensuring his state's control over the country's economic policy — a typical "milk coffee" agreement. But the Minas Gerais-São Paulo alliance contained a contradiction: on one side, the less orthodox São Paulo plutocrats, and on the other, career politicians from Minas Gerais, who valued fiscal balance. Sampaio Vidal was known for his proposal, when deputy, to issue unbacked bills to finance the defence of coffee. His name displeased orthodox politicians from Minas Gerais: Antônio Carlos Ribeiro de Andrada, leader of the majority in the Chamber of Deputies, Mário Brant and Afonso Pena Júnior.

The Ministry of Internal Affairs went to João Luís Alves from Minas Gerais, Foreign Affairs to Félix Pacheco, from Piauí, Transport and Public Works to Francisco Sá, from Minas Gerais, and Agriculture to Miguel Calmon, from Bahia. In the military ministries of War and Navy, marshal Setembrino de Carvalho and admiral Alexandrino de Alencar. Epitácio Pessoa's experiment, the first head of state of Republican Brazil to place the Armed Forces under civilian ministers, was abandoned. The choice of the Minister of War was particularly difficult, as there were not many officers who were both loyal to the government and respected among their peers. The chosen one had political skills, achieving the feat of using the Brazilian Army as a pillar of support for the government.

Sampaio Vidal was replaced by Aníbal Freire in January 1925. In the following month, João Luís Alves was appointed justice to the Supreme Federal Court, handing his position to Afonso Pena Júnior, keeping the Ministry of Internal Affairs in Minas Gerais' hands. In April 1926, rear admiral Arnaldo de Siqueira Pinto da Luz replaced Alexandrino de Alencar in the navy after the later's death.

=== Political police ===
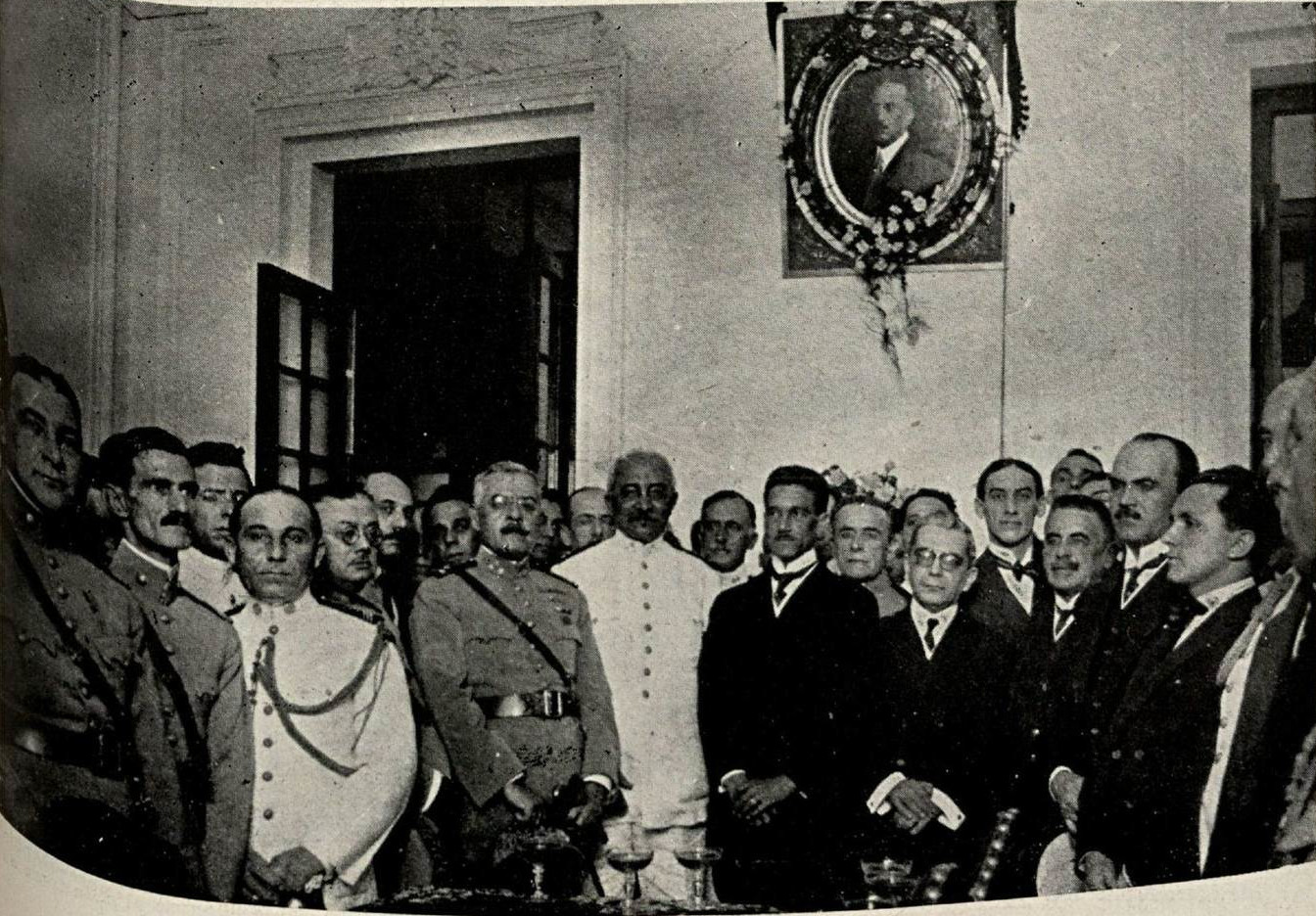
Inauguration of the presidential portrait at the Central Police Building, in Rio de Janeiro. Marshal Fontoura in white uniform in the middle

It was said in the barracks that marshal Carneiro da Fontoura's supporters would revolt if he was not chosen as Minister of War. The marshal, who "promised to exterminate the conspiracies", was appointed Chief of Police of the Federal District. Rebels and conspirators could expect tolerance from a law graduate, like all Fontoura's predecessors in office, but not from him, "accustomed to dealing with the worst elements of Rio's criminality".

His appointment was accompanied by a decree reorganizing the police, just five days after taking office. Among other measures, the Investigation and Political Security Inspectorate was transformed into the 4th Auxiliary Police Bureau, which had several sections with political police functions and was the predecessor of the Department of Political and Social Order (DOPS) in Rio. Its agents monitored suspects, investigated conspiracies and monitored association hubs, public places, factories, the movement of hotels and the embarkation and disembarkation of passengers, sometimes resorting to wiretapping, undercover agents and whistleblowers. The 4th Police Chief was major Carlos Reis, a "cold-blooded and politically skilled individual". Reis and Fontoura, nicknamed "Major Metralha" and "General Escuridão" by their enemies, were the main repression figures in the Federal District.

The state of emergency, which expired on 31 December 1922, was successively extended until April and then again until 31 December 1923, with only a few votes against in Congress. This measure suspended constitutional guarantees for a specified time period, legitimizing arrests without trial and strengthening the police in relation to the Judiciary. Much of the press was censored. According to the prevailing current in Congress and the Supreme Court, the state of emergency was the middle ground between that of war and full peace and could be used preemptively by any government that felt threatened with overthrow.

After the end of Bernardes' term and the state of emergency, the press published denunciations against his repressive apparatus. The newspaper O Combate, from São Paulo, mentioned the "new rich of Bernardism": the heads of the political police enriched through illicit means. O Globo accused the presidential group of having used censorship in favour of its private interests, such as the ban on reporting sugar prices on the international market, protecting businesses owned by the president's friends.

=== Income tax ===
On 31 December, the law that budgeted the General Revenue for the following year established income tax in Brazil. This was also the first direct tax levied at the federal level in the country. An income tax already existed in some periods since the Brazilian Empire, but it only applied to salaries paid from the public coffers. The charge on global income, established in December 1922, was promoted by Antônio Carlos Ribeiro de Andrada, president of the Chamber of Deputies' Finance Committee and budget rapporteur. A complex tax, it was criticized for the administrative machinery it needed, and was not collected immediately. The collection system was studied and organized by engineer Francisco Tito de Souza Reis.

The collection was organized using Treasury employees. The rates ranged from 0.5 to 8% on earnings and exempted income lower than 20 million réis. A much criticized point, the exemption for rural producers, was removed in the law for 1926. Collection began in 1924, extracting 25,19 billion réis from 82,594 taxpayers. The tax was not very effective in its first years and underwent several modifications. The taxpayer base grew to four times its initial size by 1929.

== 1923 ==
=== Federal intervention in Rio de Janeiro ===
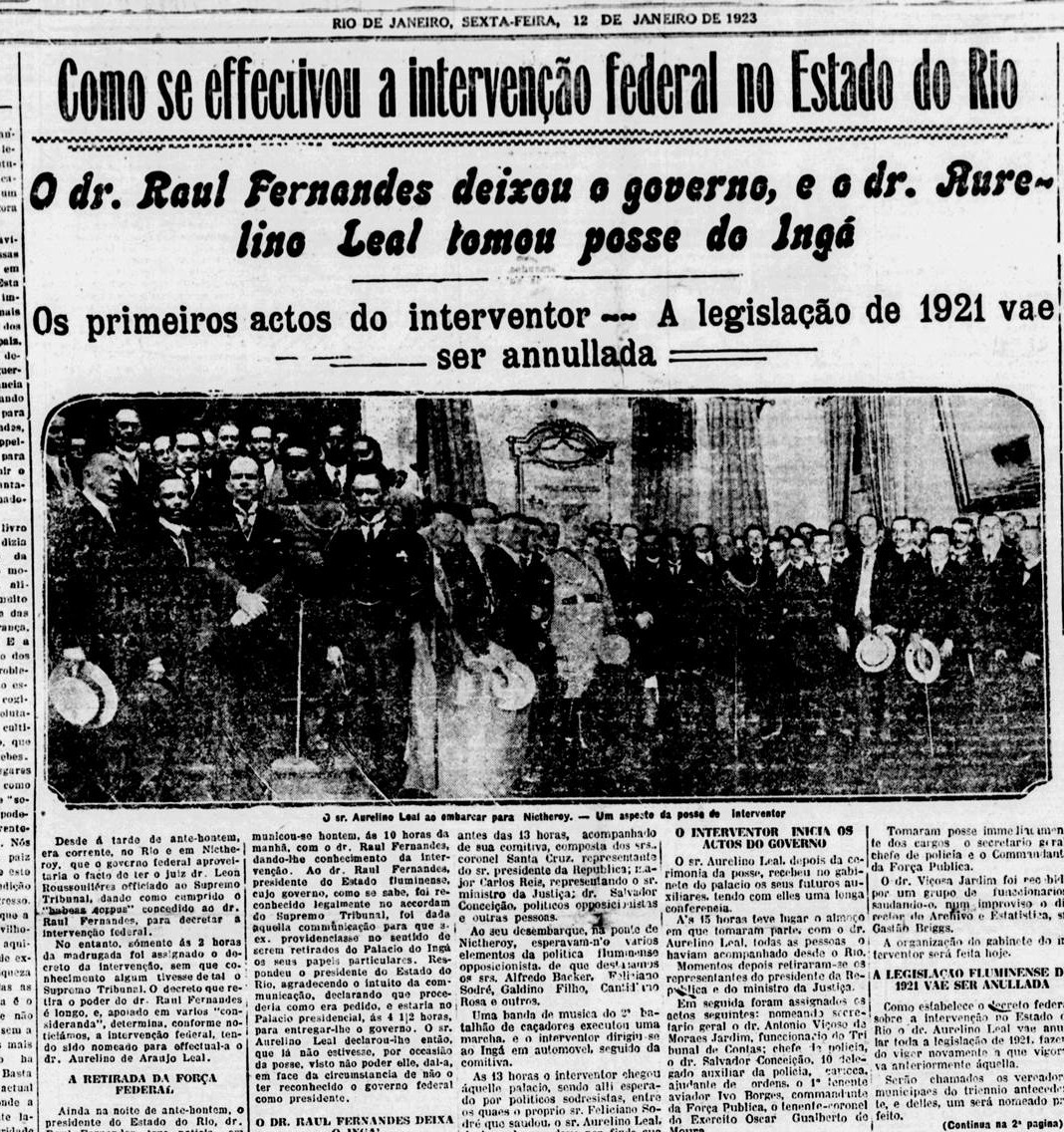
Aurelino Leal taking office as federal intervener in Rio de Janeiro

Raul Fernandes, the new president (governor) of Rio de Janeiro, who would be sworn in on 1 January 1923, feared the enmity of the federal government and sought out Bernardes before taking office. Bernardes received him kindly, but a few days later warned that he would not give any guarantees. This was Benardes' chance to retaliate against Peçanha, whose oligarchy, at the time represented by Raul Fernandes, had dominated the state of Rio de Janeiro since 1914. In the New Year, the president thanked a telegram announcing Fernandes' inauguration and warned of another inauguration message from the oppositionist Feliciano Sodré, who contested the gubernatorial election results and also declared himself governor. The state now had two Executives and two Legislatures.

The "Nilist" (ally of Nilo Peçanha) governor took office secured by federal troops and a writ of habeas corpus from the Supreme Court. Once in power, Raul Fernandes was boycotted by the federal government. The state's Public Force became insubordinate, letters and telegrams were not delivered to members of the government when they were not addressed by name and the State treasurer did not receive the checks and postal orders collected in the countryside. Violence took over the state's municipalities, where Feliciano Sodré's supporters, claiming they were being threatened, removed local authorities — with the help of marshal Fontoura's police, according to the Nilists.

On 10 January, Bernardes decreed federal intervention, "considering that the state of dual governments is producing this disorder in all municipalities in the State of Rio, with neither of the would-be presidents being able to assert their authority, which requires the action of the Union to achieve public peace and tranquility". The decree installed the federal intervener Aurelino Leal in the state Executive, who "will replace the normal State government in everything". With these powers, the intervener, supposedly a figure free from partisanship, was able to remove the Nilists from the public machine. The election was annulled and new elections called. The decision to intervene in Rio de Janeiro was much discussed and even the Supreme Court debated whether to issue a note of protest.

=== The Bank of Brazil and coffee ===
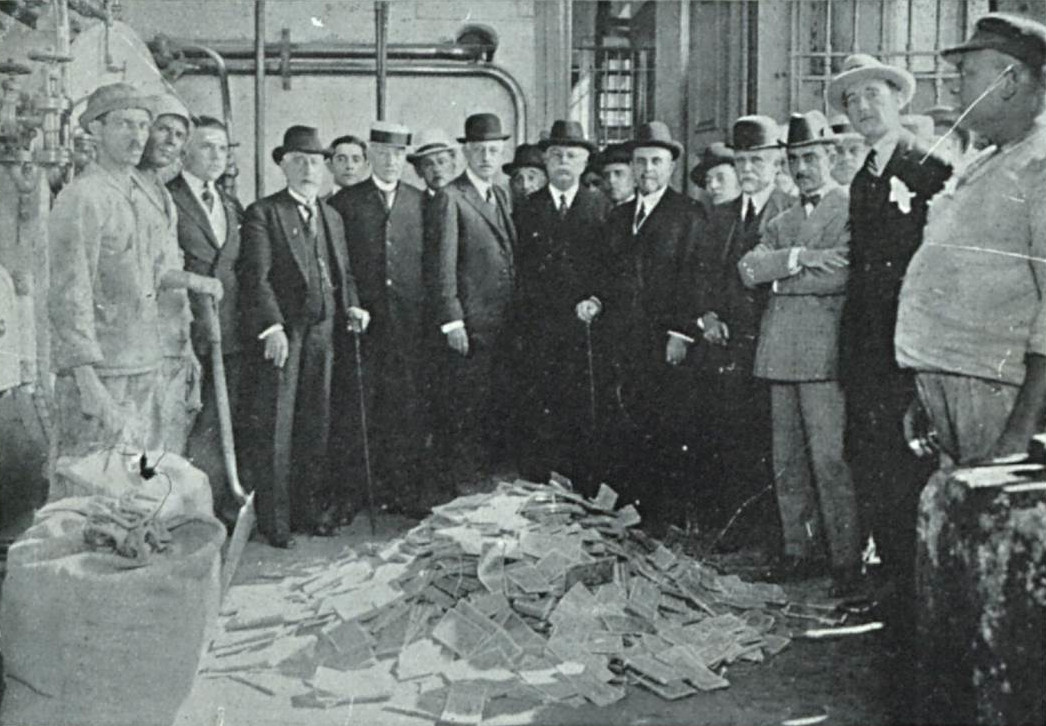

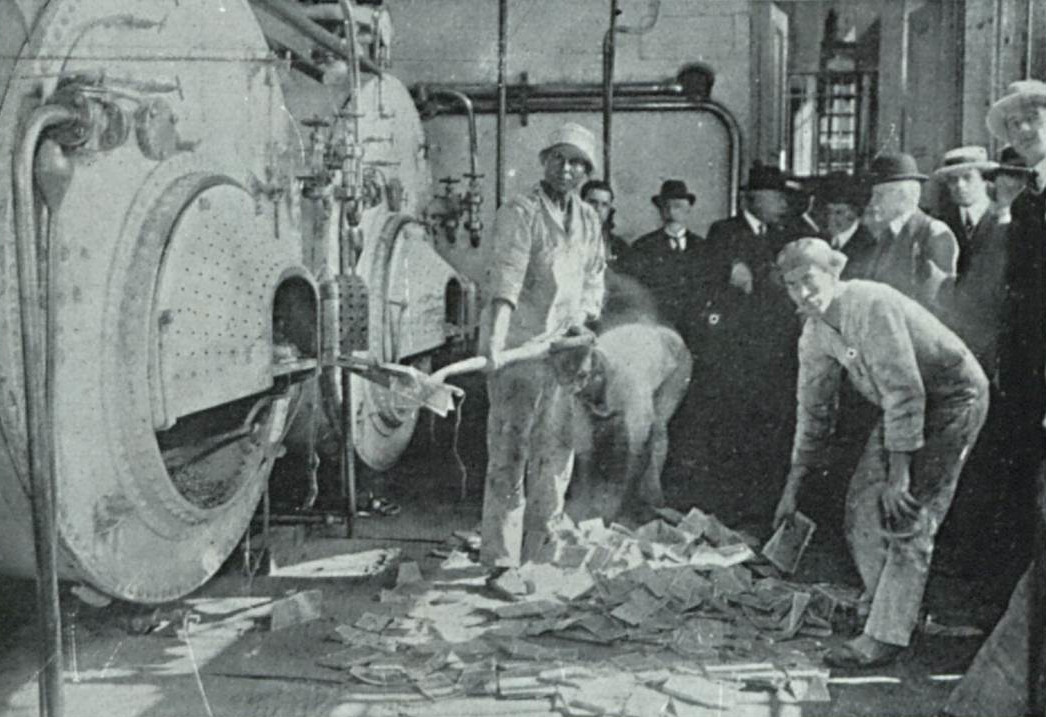
The Finance Minister and directors of the Bank of Brazil watching the burning of 290 billion réis

The Epitácio Pessoa administration, yielding to pressure from São Paulo, purchased coffee stocks to protect prices, inflating the economy. The cost of living doubled between 1921 and 1923 by some imprecise calculations. Consequently, the Bernardes administration was extremely unpopular in urban areas, especially in Rio de Janeiro. Bernardes did not open the Catete Palace to public visits and only appeared in public in closed spaces or to previously selected audiences. He remembered his presidential campaign, when angry mobs booed and attacked his entourage with sticks. His appointed mayor for the Federal District, Alaor Prata, was harshly criticized in the Rio press.

The third coffee valorization plan had been underway since 1921, financed by a loan of 9 million pounds from British banks. Coffee prices were rising: the American and European economies were recovering and Prohibition in the United States increased demand. Conditions for the loan limited further valorization operations, however. The new coffee protection scheme would transfer profits and losses from coffee storage from the federal government to producers. Production would be compulsorily retained in "regulatory warehouses", built at railway junctions, and released as the federal government saw fit. Coffee growers would receive a note from the warehouses, called "conhecimento", with which they could seek credit from banks or exporting firms. The process would be managed by the Institute for the Permanent Defence of Coffee, provided for by law at the end of the previous administration, but this organization did not come to operate.

Notes in the warehouses could be exchanged at the Bank of Brazil. The scheme required a lender of last resort in case national or foreign private banks were unable to finance coffee planters. This role would be played by the Bank of Brazil, in which an issuance department was created, in practice a successor to the former Carteira do Redesconto. On 2 January 1923, the bank received the monopoly on monetary issuance and gold reserves from the Treasury, amounting to around £10 million. In practice, the reform did not make inflation financing difficult at all, if the government so desired. It could issue up to triple the value in gold, converted to the national currency at a rate of 12 pence per mil-réis, for a total of 600 billion réis. This would be an appreciation of almost double the exchange rate at that time (6.3).

Therefore, gold backed a third of issuances, with the remainder based on commercial securities. At first, the notes issued would not be convertible. Full convertibility would be achieved later, and 12 pence was the valuation target. This reform simultaneously dealt with two points of the government programme: the creation of a central bank and the relief of the Treasury's debt with the Bank of Brazil. The bank's president, José Maria Whitaker, was too orthodox for this reform and was replaced by São Paulo native Cincinato Braga, one of the main mentors of the new policy. In February, the remaining stocks from the third recovery scheme, 3.4 million bags, began to be sold. They were equivalent to 22% of the world's coffee production from the 1922–1923 crop, and sales were spaced out so as not to increase the price too much.

=== Labour legislation ===
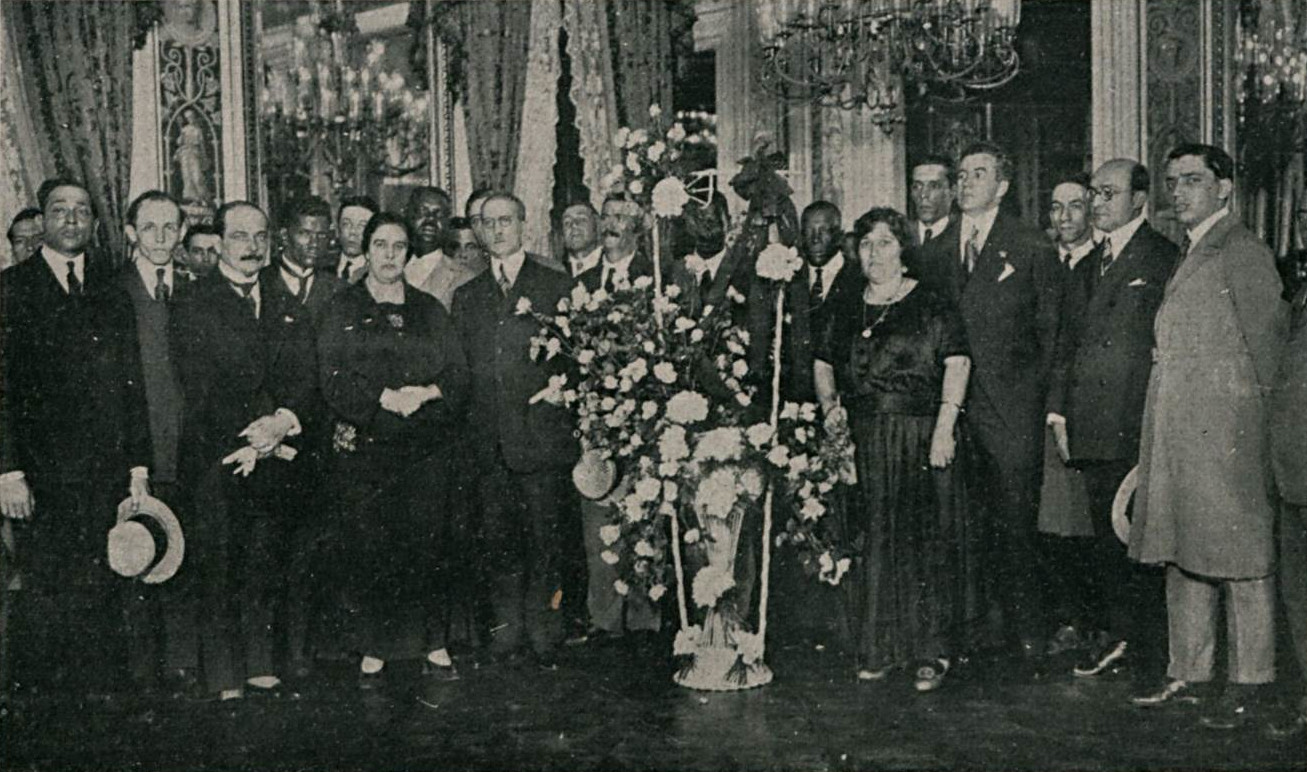
Artur and Clélia Bernardes receiving worker representatives

On 24 January, Bernardes enacted the so-called Eloy Chaves Law, which established pension and retirement funds for railway workers and is considered the origin of social security in Brazil. Labour and welfare measures had been promised during the presidential campaign and several were approved during the remainder of Benardes' term: the creation of the National Labour Council, made up of government, employers and workers representatives, the protection of abandoned minors, restriction of child labour, creation of the position of "special curator for accidents at work" and 15 days of yearly paid vacation in the business, industry and banking sectors. In 1924, May 1, Labour Day, was declared a national holiday; according to Bernardes, the date was not intended for "subversive projects", but for the "glorification of orderly and useful labour".

These laws were modest and often circumvented by employers. They were partly motivated by the country's concern with its image abroad, where it was expected that Brazil, as a participant in the International Labour Conferences, would institute the labour rights suggested there. In the same period, under the state of emergency, police raids and union closures became more frequent and strikes were smaller than in the previous decade. Of the governments at the end of the First Brazilian Republic, that of Bernardes was simultaneously the one that most intervened in labour relations and most repressed the labour movement. The direction in which it was pointed was towards official unionism like that implemented by Getúlio Vargas in the following decade. The unions with the largest number of members during this period were the so-called "yellow" ones, with good relations with the government and the police, especially among maritime and transport workers.

=== War in Rio Grande do Sul ===
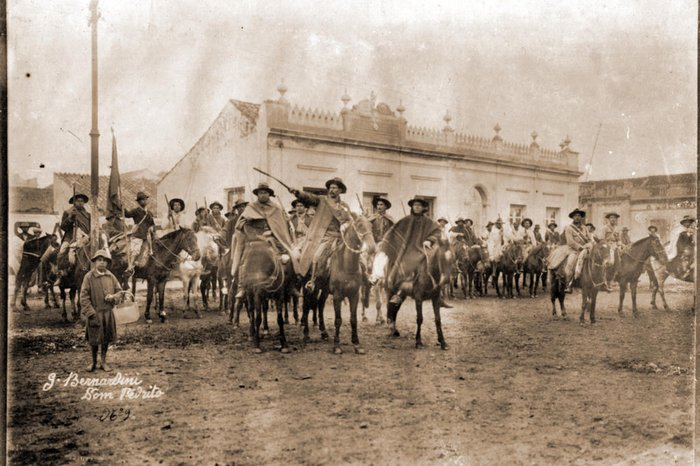
Honório Lemes' revolutionaries

The repercussions of the crisis in Rio de Janeiro were overshadowed by the outbreak of a civil war in Rio Grande do Sul on 25 January. The local opposition, led by Assis Brasil, rose up against the state government of Borges de Medeiros, whose reelection it denounced as illegitimate. At the beginning of Medeiros' new term, "liberator" (oppositionist) leaders such as Artur Caetano, Felipe Portinho, Leonel Rocha, Zeca Neto and Honório Lemes took up arms. With a disadvantage of weapons against the Military Brigade of Rio Grande do Sul and the Provisional Corps, it was left to the "bandoleiros" (bandits), as they were called by the government, to wage a rural guerrilla.

The liberators had supported Bernardes in the previous year's presidential election and expected federal intervention on his part to remove Borges de Medeiros, who had supported the Republican Reaction. From then on, the governor sought to comply with federal guidelines and avoid a conflict with the president. Bernardes took advantage of the opportunity, but did not dare to directly intervene, as the Republican Party of Rio Grande do Sul (PRR) had been in power for decades and was protected by the Military Brigade. Bernardes refused an arbitration court for the election and kept the Federal Army neutral. Goodwill of federal officers towards the revolutionaries was visible, however; and there were cases of clandestine supply of ammunition and even defections.

On 3 May, Bernardes announced that there was no duality of governments in the state to justify intervention. Nor was there a request from the state government, as required by the Constitution. In Congress, the debate was going on about the intervention in Rio de Janeiro. Rio Grande do Sul deputy Getúlio Vargas voted in favour of it, instructed by Borges de Medeiros, so as to bring his state closer to the federal government. Vargas argued based on the duality of governments in Rio de Janeiro and the deposed authorities in the countryside. Bahia deputy Raul Alves replied that, by the same reasoning, there would be a dual government in Rio Grande do Sul, if Assis Brasil so wanted. Vargas insisted: the revolutionaries in his state were "marching in the countryside, but they are not occupying any district in Rio Grande do Sul". The decree was finally confirmed by Congress in September.

=== 5th Pan-American Conference ===
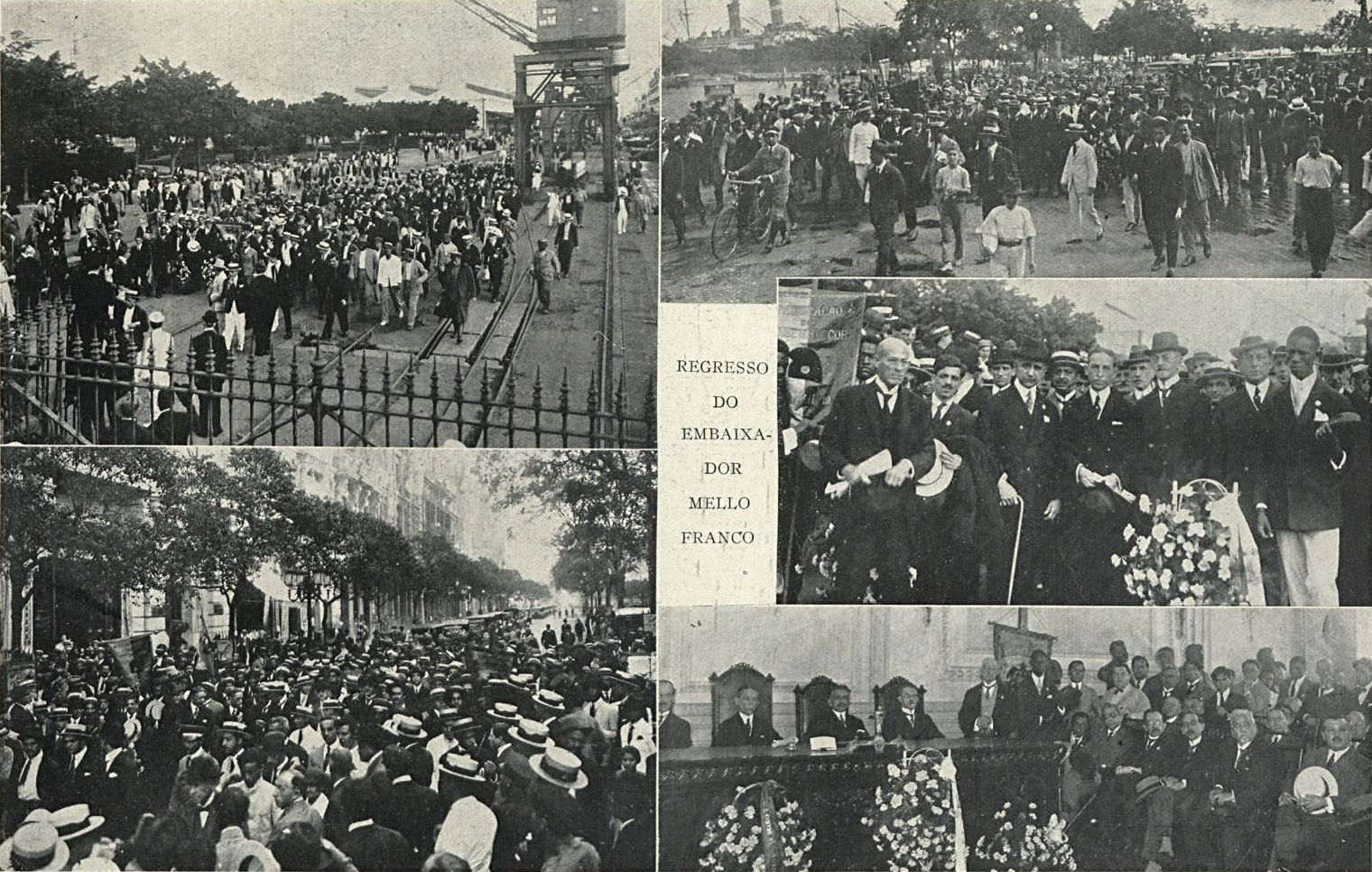
Return to Rio of Brazilian representative Afrânio de Melo Franco

In March, Brazil took part in the 5th Pan-American Conference held in Santiago, Chile. Foreign minister Félix Pacheco refused to represent the country in protest at the absence of Charles Evans Hughes, Secretary of State of the United States. In his place, the Brazilian delegation was led by Afrânio de Melo Franco, who was the Brazilian representative at the League of Nations, and Silvino Gurgel do Amaral, the Brazilian ambassador to Chile.

At the League of Nations' Assembly, in Geneva, Melo Franco had instructions to promote the creation of new permanent seats in the Deliberative Council for Brazil and Spain. The claim to a permanent seat on the council can be compared, in the 21st century, to Brazil's ambition at a permanent seat on the United Nations Security Council. The country's size and population, its participation in World War I, and its pre-eminence in the Western Hemisphere convinced the government of this possibility. Since 1922, Brazil was one of four provisional members, while the permanent members were France, Great Britain, Italy and Japan.

The country's exaggerated confidence in the League's power and in its equality with the great powers disconcerted diplomacy with Latin American countries. This became visible in Santiago when the Brazilian mission rejected a proposal to disarm and freeze naval forces. This stance made sense, since the Brazilian Armed Forces were obsolete, unlike what existed in Argentina and Chile, countries that had been engaged in an arms race. The Argentine mission branded Brazil as militaristic. The result of the debate was an inconsequential resolution, which did not specify budget cuts.

=== Press Law ===
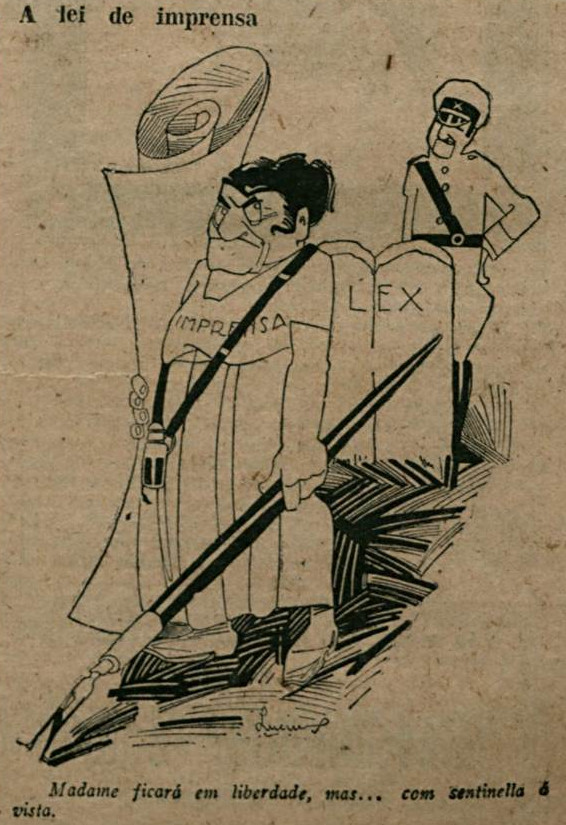
Illustration in the magazine O Malho: the press "in freedom, but... with a sentry in sight"

In June 1923, a bill returned to the agenda to "regulate the exercise of the press". Authored by senator Adolfo Gordo, it had been debated in Congress since 1922, in the aftermath of the crisis of the fake letters. The bill was welcomed by a significant part of the business press, such as O Paiz and Gazeta de Notícias, in Rio de Janeiro, and Correio Paulistano, Estado de S. Paulo and A Gazeta, in São Paulo. A commentator in O Paiz argued that the press lived "on scandals, insults and slander", under the action of "unrepentant supporters of all hatred", while another stated that freedom of the press "only has one fair synonym: respect. Without it, we fall into abuse, into debauchery".

Its proponents argued that there was full freedom for discussion, while opponents considered it absurd to debate the proposal in the midst of a state of emergency, with newspapers suffering criminal prosecutions and journalists being arrested and attacked. Jornal do Brasil, O Imparcial, Gazeta de Notícias and other newspapers critical of the government had copies seized and newsrooms raided. For Correio da Manhã, the law established the crime of opinion, and for O Imparcial, the proposal was "the death of freedom of opinion in Brazil". The repeal of the law would later be one of the tenentists' declared objectives.

The final draft, approved in October, established the right of reply, prior restraint, special imprisonment and penalties for "press crimes", including the exposure of "State secrets" and "offenses against the President of the Republic", it prohibited anonymity, tried to limit the "clandestine" press and made clear the editors' responsibility for published content, eliminating a legal obstacle to criminal complaints of libel and slander. The law impacted liberal opinion in the business press, as the working-class press had already been persecuted, with the closure of workshops and the arrests of journalists, since the last years of the previous decade.

Nine days after the law came into force, Correio da Manhã called Epitácio Pessoa a tyrant and repeated an old accusation that he had favoured sugar exporters after receiving a diamond necklace for his wife from sugar mill owners. The former president accused journalist Mário Rodrigues of slander and, in the resulting lawsuit, lawyer Evaristo de Morais tried to prove that the law was unconstitutional. The case reached the Supreme Court and Mário Rodrigues was sentenced to one year in prison. The newspaper A Manhã was sued over an accusation of spoiled lard in a warehouse belonging to the Anglo company, and O Globo was sued over an accusation of favouritism by the Institute of Chemistry of the Ministry of Agriculture towards some butter producers in Minas Gerais.

=== Suspension of the state of emergency ===
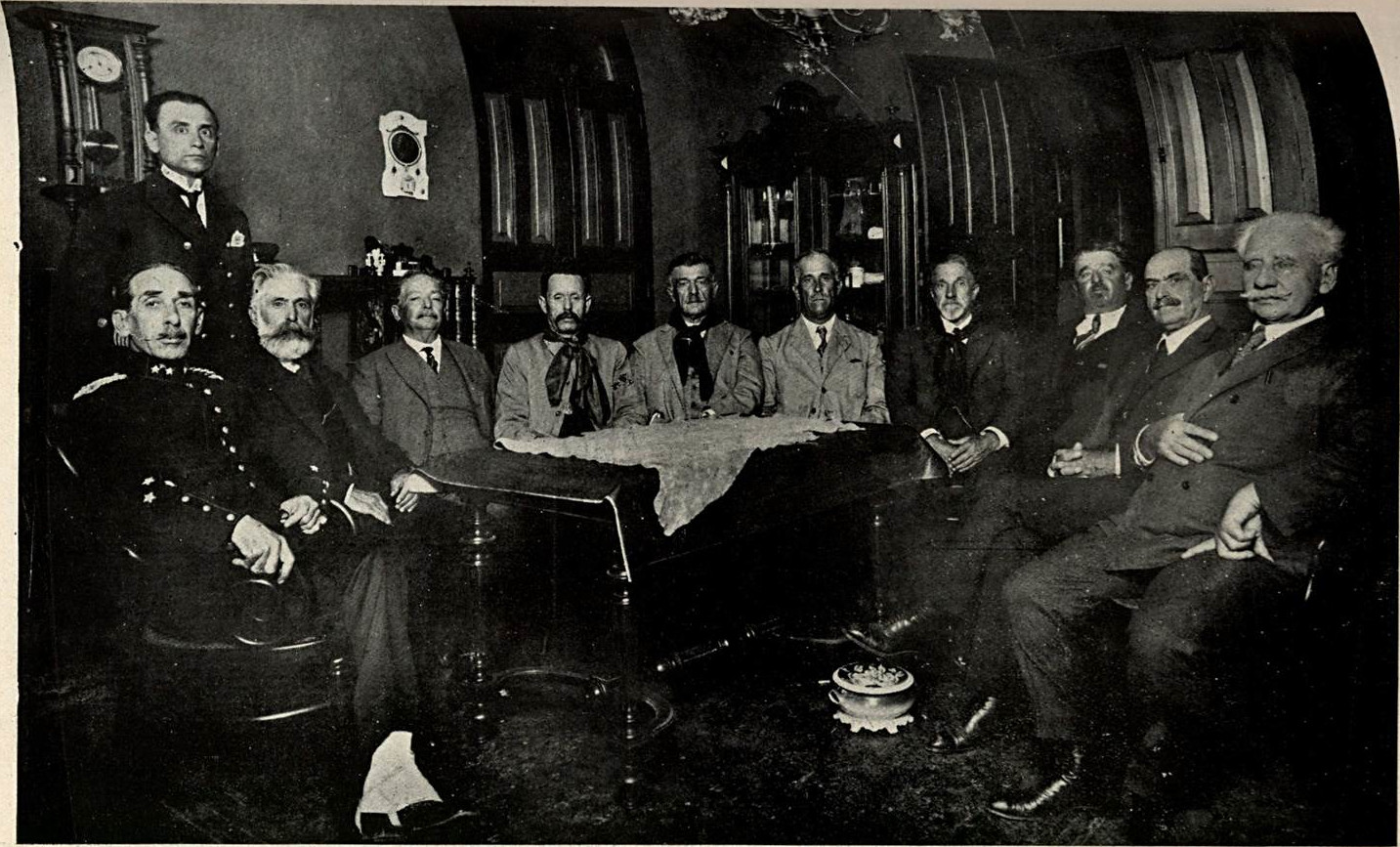
The Minister of War (first seated on the left) negotiating with revolutionary leaders from Rio Grande do Sul

In order to win the votes of Rio Grande do Sul congressmen for the Press Law, Bernardes promised not to extend the state of emergency, and it was ended by decree on 23 December. On the same day, governor Feliciano Sodré took office in the state of Rio de Janeiro, after new elections for the state's Executive and Legislative Assembly. Peçanha's faction did not even participate and found itself completely removed from power. Shortly before, on the 14th, the Pact of Pedras Altas was signed in Rio Grande do Sul, which ended the war and granted amnesty to the revolutionaries, guaranteed room for the opposition in the Assembly and Congress, and kept Borges de Medeiros in his positions, but prohibited his re-election. The revolutionaries achieved all their demands except the immediate deposition of the governor, inaugurating a new era in Rio Grande do Sul politics.

Bernardes' intermediary in Rio Grande do Sul was war minister Setembrino de Carvalho, the last of a series of presidential emissaries. (Note: According to the American consul in Montevideo, Hoffman Philip, Bernardes' intention was for the mission to fail so that he could replace the minister (Meirelles 2002, pp. 114–115).) The first, Tavares de Lira, arrived in May, when PRR military successes frustrated any agreement. Nabuco de Gouvêa, the following month, had the same result. Conditions for peace improved towards the end of the year: a PRR victory seemed unlikely, but the liberators were unable to threaten the large cities, with the exception of Pelotas. With the agreement, Borges de Medeiros gained a few additional years in power at the cost of a commitment to loyalty to Bernardes.

=== Trial of the tenentists ===
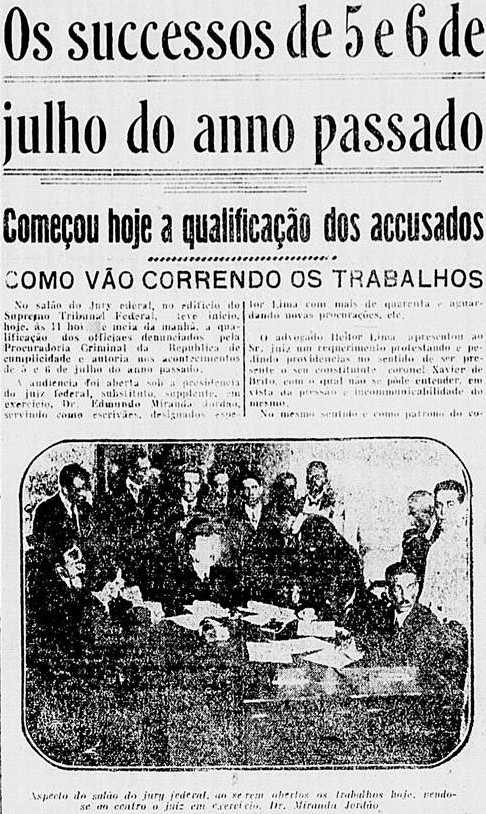
Repercussion in the press of the tenentists trial

While minister Setembrino de Carvalho returned from Rio Grande do Sul via the São Paulo-Rio Grande Railway, lieutenant Magalhães Barata was arrested on 25 December. The complaint was a plan to arrest the minister while he was passing through Ponta Grossa, signaling a revolt by troops from Paraná and part of Rio de Janeiro. Rumours of uprisings and attempted coups were continually monitored by the Rio police. Loyalist sentiment seemed to win when Setembrino de Carvalho was elected president of the Military Club, after May. Army lieutenants were punished with transfers, but order did not prevail in the barracks.

The following day, 50 army officers were sentenced for participating in the Copacabana Fort revolt, a trial followed with great apprehension. Some officers were planning a new uprising, but waited until December for a presidential amnesty. This measure was common for military insubordination in previous decades, and precisely for this reason the Bernardes administration did not want to encourage indiscipline. This time, however, amnesty did not come, which was seen by military dissidents as a vindictive move. Bernardes saw the measure as a victory for the Republican Reaction.

Private reports about subversive activities in the military reached the president's desk in the first months of 1924. The political police knew that a new revolt was about to break out, although its date, location and extent were unknown. Defectors who refused to hand themselves over to the authorities after their trial formed the nucleus of the conspiracy: Siqueira Campos, Joaquim and Juarez Távora, Eduardo Gomes and other "professional revolutionaries". Their extensive activities far from Rio de Janeiro, taking advantage of the deterioration of the government's image, went unnoticed by the police apparatus. But no active generals conspired, as they were directly chosen by the president.

=== The Montagu Mission ===
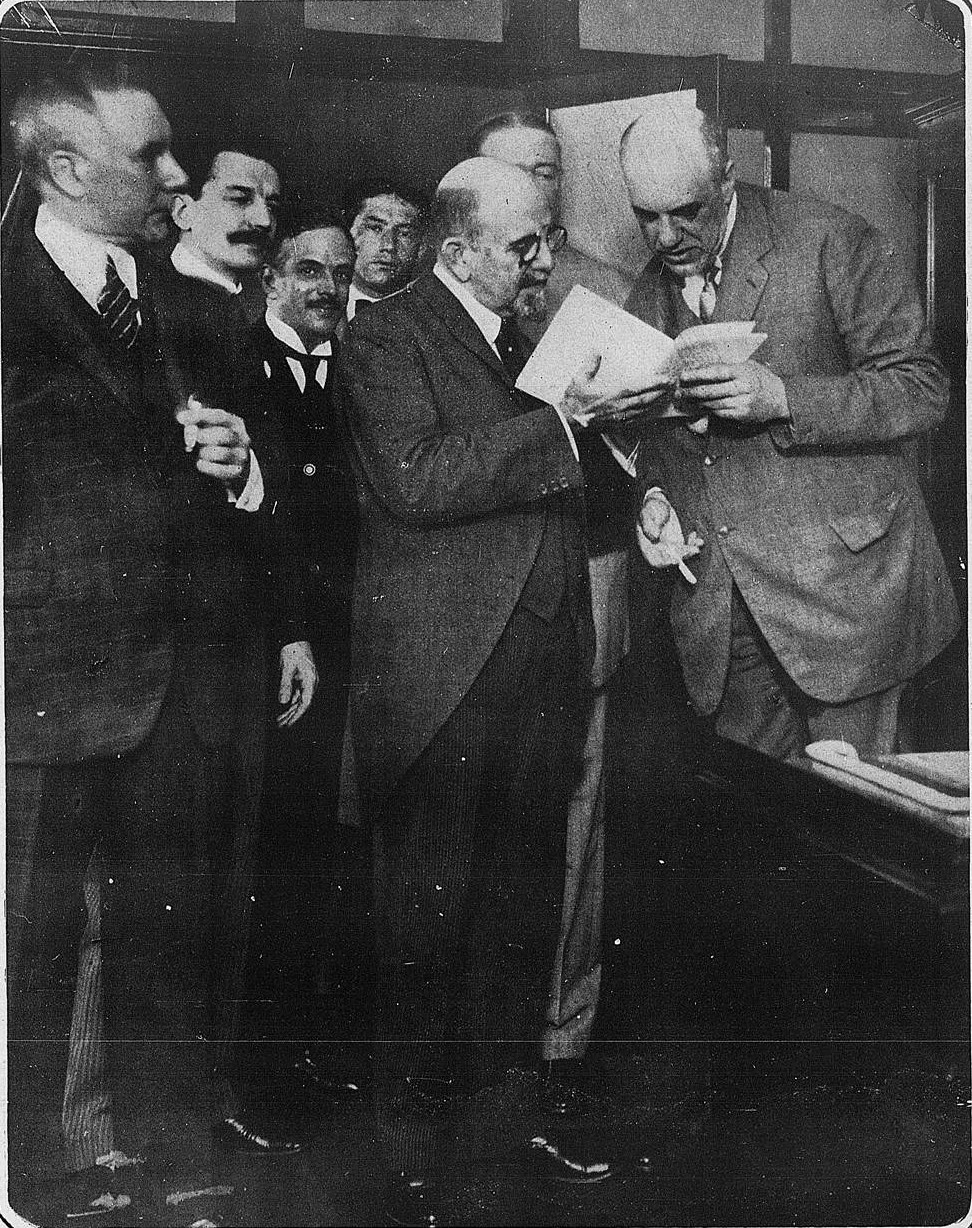
Sampaio Vidal and Edwin Montagu, respectively on the left and right, holding a document

Edwin Samuel Montagu, former financial secretary of the British Treasury, arrived in Rio de Janeiro on 30 December, accompanied by a delegation of British financial experts, the "Montagu Mission". Its goal was to propose reforms to be implemented by the Brazilian government in exchange for a loan of £25 million. Their usual bankers, the Rothschilds, had the bargaining power to impose this mission, increasingly common abroad. As British ambassador John Tilley wrote to George Curzon, "if [Bernardes] is forced to beg for money he may have to swallow the pill of foreign advice".

The better informed Brazilians feared the political repercussions of the mission, but saw the loan as the only painless solution to the country's economic situation. The 1923 coffee crop exceeded 19.5 million bags, more than double the previous one, and there were still stocks from the appreciation to be liquidated. Financial policy, restrictive in the first half of the year, began to get out of control in the second. The Bank of Brazil resorted to money issuance. The price of coffee did not plummet, but inflation accelerated. In the second half of August alone, the mil-reis depreciated by 12%. The entire economic reform could be demoralized. The only alternative to borrowing would be a painful deflationary adjustment.

The Montagu Mission criticized the way budgets were done, but praised the fiscal sanitation measures. The government cut expenses, including civil servant wages and public works, when the deficit forecast for 1923 was much larger than expected. The real deficit decreased to 25% of the previous year's value. Austerity affected investments against drought in the Northeast initiated by the previous administration, under the justification that the works had been successful. Epitácio Pessoa had paid for the importation of machinery, equipment and cement for the construction of dams and roads in the region, which did not please either São Paulo coffee growers or the local oligarchs. In 1925, only 3,827 million réis were spent on this project.

== 1924 ==
=== State of emergency in Bahia ===
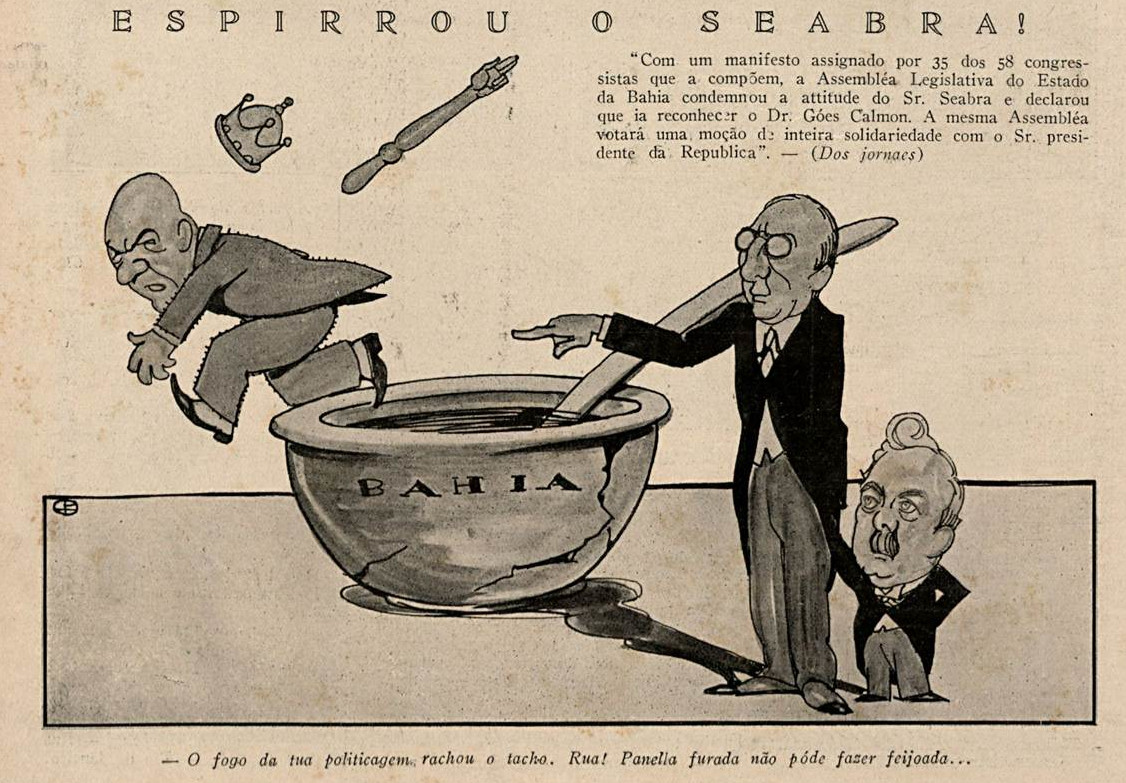
Seabra, the "king" of Bahia's politics, is expelled from power by Bernardes

The gubernatorial elections in Bahia, held in January 1924, pitted Arlindo Leoni and Góis Calmon, both of whom declared themselves winners, with a duality of Legislative Assemblies. Calmon was originally a conciliation candidate chosen by governor J. J. Seabra, Peçanha's running mate in the 1922 presidential election. Under other circumstances, Seabra would have launched senator Muniz Sodré. The choice for Calmon, according to Eul-Soo Pang, was already an admission of defeat. But this was also a maneuver directed against Bernardes, as Calmon was the brother of the minister of agriculture and a friend of the president.

The maneuver had no effect. It was said in Bahia that Bernardes approved the agreement between the two factions, the governor's Democratic Republican Party (PRD) and the opposition's Republican Concentration of Bahia (CRB). Conciliation was not actually achieved and Bernardes remained hostile to the PRD. The senatorial election in July resulted in two candidates declaring themselves as winners, as was customary. The Federal Senate, guided by the Bernardes administration, swore in Pedro Lago, from the CRB, against Arlindo Leoni, from the PRD. The governor's party was convinced that it would not be saved by conciliation.

Seabra questioned Bernardes about the information, received from deputy Medeiros Neto, that Calmon had promised the president that he would "eradicate Seabrism". Bernardes did not deny it. On 27 November 1923, Seabra, faced with political suicide, withdrew his support for Calmon. His last-minute candidate, Arlindo Leoni, was nicknamed "dead cat", as Calmon had growing popularity and support from parts of the PRD. Minister Miguel Calmon and senator Lago sent a telegram to the state's Public Force and the countryside colonels to vote for Góis, and Bernardes asked Horácio de Matos for support. The election took place on 29 December. After contesting the results, Leoni filed a habeas corpus petition with the Supreme Court to take office, and the opposition asked for federal intervention.

The federal government transferred the 28th Battalion of Caçadores from Aracaju to Salvador in December 1923. The commanders of this battalion and the 19th, from Salvador, were not trustworthy and were replaced. Additional reinforcements arrived in February: the 20th Battalion of Caçadores, from Maceió, the 3rd Heavy Machine Gun Company, from Rio de Janeiro, a battery from the 5th Mountain Artillery Group, from Valença, the cruiser Barroso, the auxiliary cruiser José Bonifácio and the destroyer Rio Grande do Norte. Army soldiers patrolled the streets and occupied public facilities such as the State Chamber, the Official Press, the Treasury and the Library. The Public Force was bribed to transfer its weapons to the 6th Military Region's HQ. Protected by federal weapons, Góis Calmon took office without resistance. Ironically, he had supported the bombing of Salvador in 1912, when federal forces overthrew the state government as part of the Salvation Policy (federal interventions).

Bernardes' final act against his old enemies of 1922 was in the elections for senator in the Federal District. Only the results of the sections in which Mendes Tavares won were validated, canceling all the others and "beheading" the candidacy of Irineu Machado, one of those involved in the crisis of the fake letters. Peçanha died on 31 March. The reckoning with Republican Reaction was concluded, and all its former members were incorporated into the government base, "not as political partners, but as resigned losers". Bernardes imposed his will at the cost of gaining even more civilian and military enemies. The measures taken in Rio de Janeiro and Bahia have already been analysed as a moment of decadence or transformation of the "Governors' Policy", in which the federal government, in exchange for support in Congress, did not intervene in the internal politics of the states.

=== Rapprochement with the Church ===
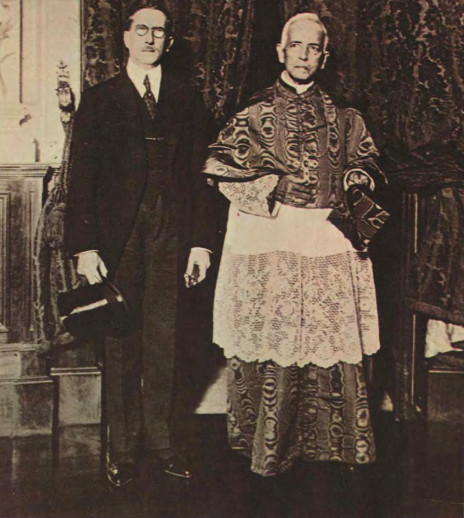
The president and cardinal Arcoverde confirm the rapprochement between Church and State

On 4 May, Bernardes and the entire ministry attended the golden jubilee of D. Arcoverde, the archbishop of Rio de Janeiro and first Brazilian cardinal — an unprecedented visit since the separation between the Catholic Church and the Brazilian State and a public exhibition of their rapprochement, which had already begun under the previous government. Bernardes was personally distinguished by his Catholic religiosity, cemented by his secondary education at the Caraça School — although, according to him, he was no longer a practicing Catholic in 1925, and only later resumed his religion.

The interests of both were not always compatible throughout Bernardes' presidency; After the revolt of July 1924, Bernardes criticized the Church's protection of political prisoners as excessive, and the following year his government silenced Catholic demands for the constitutional reform project. Even so, in 1925 Jornal do Commercio was able to state that "the national problems of Indian education and catechesis have never had as much support from Catholic works as at this moment. And the government has always counted, absolutely, on the patriotic collaboration of the Episcopate and of the clergy in general". The president even proposed the candidacy of D. Leme for the Senate, representing the state of Rio de Janeiro, against the candidacy of Raul Fernandes.

=== Montagu Report ===
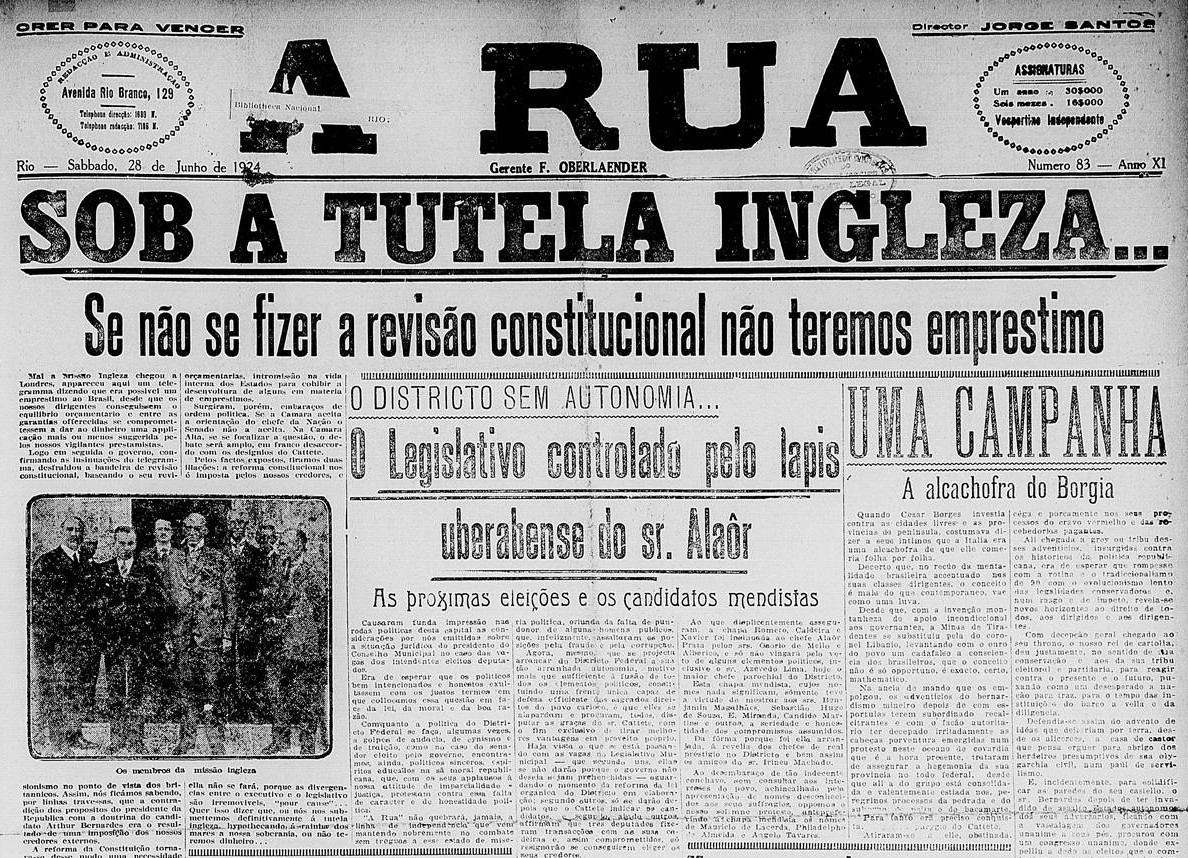
The opposition criticizes the Montagu Mission: "Under English tutelage". "If the constitutional review is not carried out, we will not have a loan"

The Montagu Mission left the country on 4 March, shortly after delivering the provisional version of its report to the Brazilian government. The most difficult thing was getting Bernardes to agree to the sale of government shares in the Bank of Brazil, 52% of the total. This would guarantee the bank's independence, but Montagu wanted the shares to be sold to British bankers to ensure compliance with the agreement. The London bankers themselves, in correspondence with Montagu, thought it more prudent to recommend that the Brazilian government sell its shares to its own citizens. Montagu insisted on his position, which was, according to him, his only certainty when leaving London. The only guarantee of a wise financial policy in Brazil would be "with some foreign element, that is, British, in the financial system".

The other recommendations included abandoning federal subsidies for the protection of coffee, changing the procedures for preparing the federal budget, reducing public spending, especially with the dismissal of civil servants, reducing the external debt of states and municipalities, exempting some foreign investors from taxes, privatize some public companies, such as Lloyd Brasileiro and Central do Brasil, and temporarily suspend the construction project of a steel plant. This plant was part of the government programme, but Montagu argued that it would be an excessive burden on public spending. Sampaio Vidal got a promise from Montagu to finance the project in the future. The Brazilians accepted most of the demands, and Bernardes personally guaranteed that he would not take loans from other creditors.

In May, at the opening of legislative work, Bernardes proposed a constitutional reform with points that referred to British demands. In the following months, the government's allied base reformed the Chamber of Deputies and Senate regulations to facilitate constitutional review. The mission's final report was published in Jornal do Commercio on 29 June 1924, to the praise of the pro-Bernardes British and Brazilian press. La Nación, from Buenos Aires, and El Mercurio, from Santiago, noted the good reception of the report in the trading of Brazilian bonds on the London and New York stock exchanges. Oppositionists were outraged: the proposals would humiliate Brazil or even transform it into a British colony, with Bernardes as a puppet of foreign interests. Later, the manifesto of the rebellious leader João Francisco Pereira de Souza directly attacked the report, in addition to the increase given to congressmen's salaries while the army suffered cuts.

Before the sale of Bank of Brazil shares reached Congress, the British government restricted external loans, making months of negotiations futile. The Brazilian authorities now needed to look for a new solution, without depending on the loan. Even so, some of the report's proposals ended up being adopted in the reforms for the remainder of Bernardes' presidency.

=== The battle of São Paulo ===
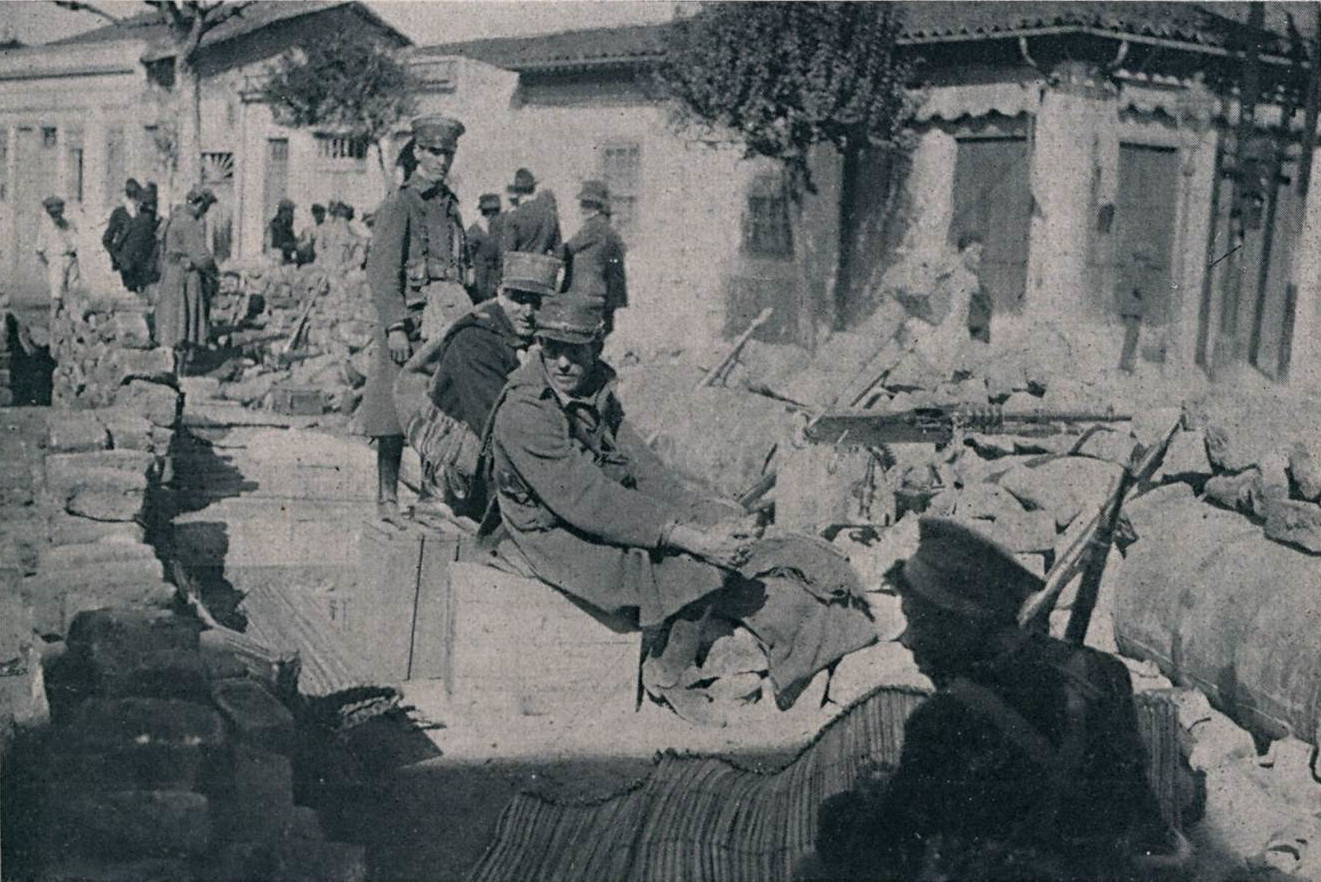
A rebel barricade on Liberdade street, São Paulo

Informed of the outbreak of an uprising by elements of the army and Public Force in the city of São Paulo, Bernardes declared a state of emergency in the Federal District and the states of Rio de Janeiro and São Paulo on 5 July 1924, on the anniversary of the Copacabana Fort revolt. Planned as a rapid blow, which would occupy the city in a few hours and then march to Rio de Janeiro, the uprising degenerated into urban combat in central São Paulo, with scenes reminiscent of the First World War. Loyalist reinforcements immediately rushed to the city, but some of them defected to the rebel side. In the countryside, the government assured control of the Paraíba Valley, the Itararé branch and the Baixada Santista.

On 9 July, the leader of the revolt, general Isidoro Dias Lopes, proclaimed himself as head of a "Provisional Government". The revolutionary manifestos clarified that the movement was national in scope, not regional, accused Bernardes of despotism, and called for his resignation. The political programme in the tenentist movement, vaguely nationalist in character, demanded freedom of the press, secret ballots and overcoming the old political oligarchies, considering itself as a revolutionary movement to overthrow a corrupt and backward regime. The situation was deteriorating in São Paulo. Revolutionary columns occupied municipalities in the countryside, factories stopped and hungry mobs looted stores. The São Paulo metropolis had a history of labour conflicts and the government feared that the revolt would degenerate into a popular insurrection, culminating in a Bolshevik-style revolution.

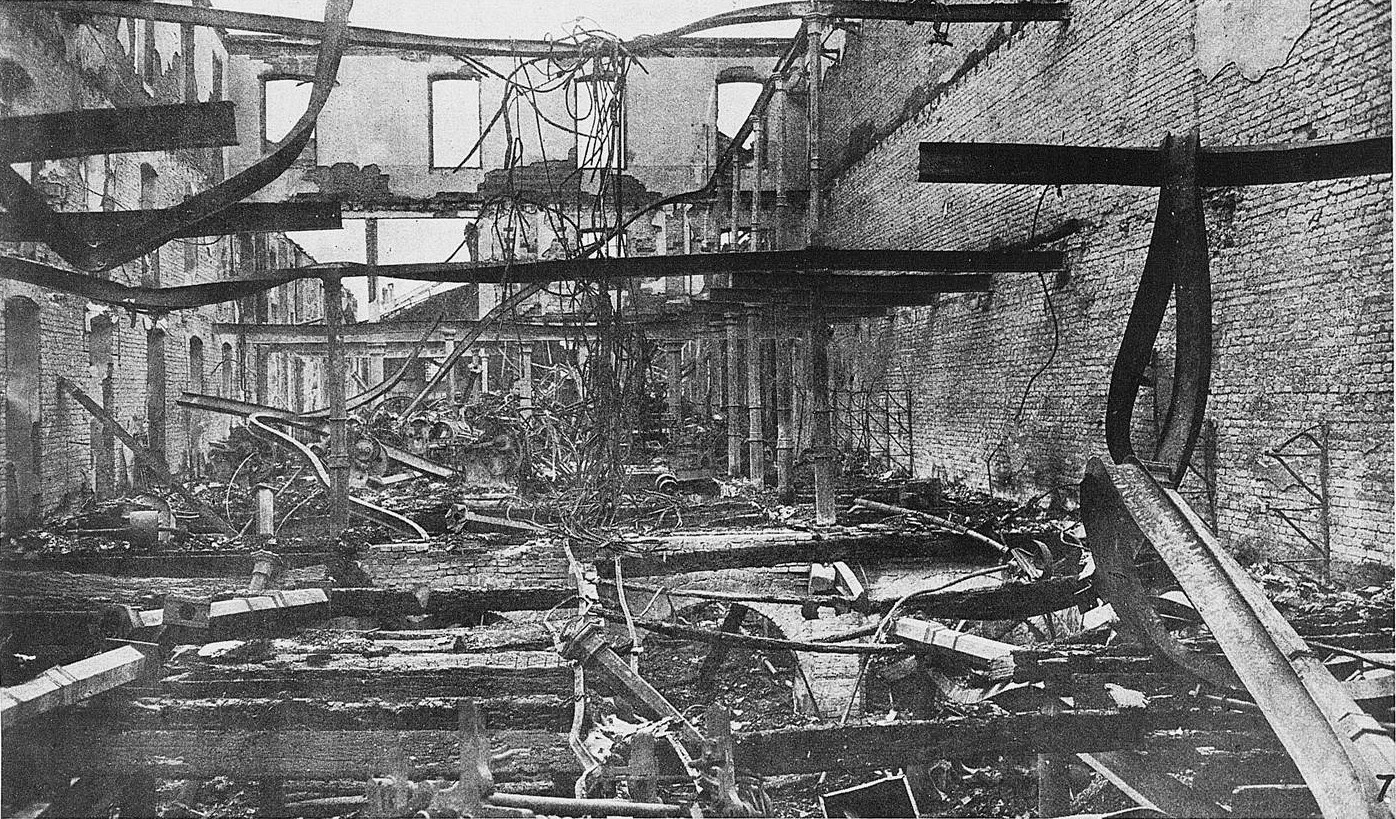
Ruins of the fire caused by artillery in a factory in São Paulo

In the second fortnight, the government forces, under the command of general Eduardo Sócrates, reached 15 thousand men from the army and state forces — among them, the Military Brigade of Rio Grande do Sul, in a gesture of rapprochement with Borges de Medeiros. Loyalist artillery indiscriminately shelled rebel territory, killing civilians, destroying factories and homes, and creating hundreds of thousands of refugees. At the end of the conflict, the city council counted 503 dead and 4,846 injured, of which two thirds were civilians. Requests to halt the bombing on humanitarian grounds were refused by the government. Loyalist pressure expelled the rebels from São Paulo on 27 July, but in the following months thousands of rebels moved to western Paraná, where they prolonged the fight.

=== Revolutionary wave ===
The permanent revolutionary threat hovered over the country. The "1924 civil war" had two major fronts: one from São Paulo to Paraná and the other in the Amazon basin. Military revolts spread across the country: in Bela Vista, Mato Grosso, on the 12th; Aracaju, in Sergipe, on the 13th; Manaus, in Amazonas, on the 23rd; and Belém, in Pará, on the 26th. In the cases of Northern and Northeastern Brazil, the very battalions that were supposed to board for the Southeast rebelled by the initiative of the lower officialdom. The military high command was forced to cancel the deployment of other battalions to quell the revolts.

Sergipe and Amazonas had ephemeral revolutionary governments, lasting 21 and 30 days respectively. In the latter, the rebels controlled most of the Amazonas Flotilla and Fort Óbidos, in the most strategic stretch of the Amazon River. However, the failure of the revolt in Belém trapped them in their territory in the Amazon. General João de Deus Mena Barreto went up the river with a loyalist detachment from the Army and Navy. The Óbidos garrison abandoned the city after a brief air raid and the government in Manaus surrendered to the authorities. Power was not returned to the deposed governor, César do Rego Monteiro, but handed over to a federal intervener. The arguments of senator Barbosa Lima's intervention bill were the same as those of the rebels regarding the authoritarianism of the deposed government and delays in payments to civil servants.

=== The loyalist support base ===
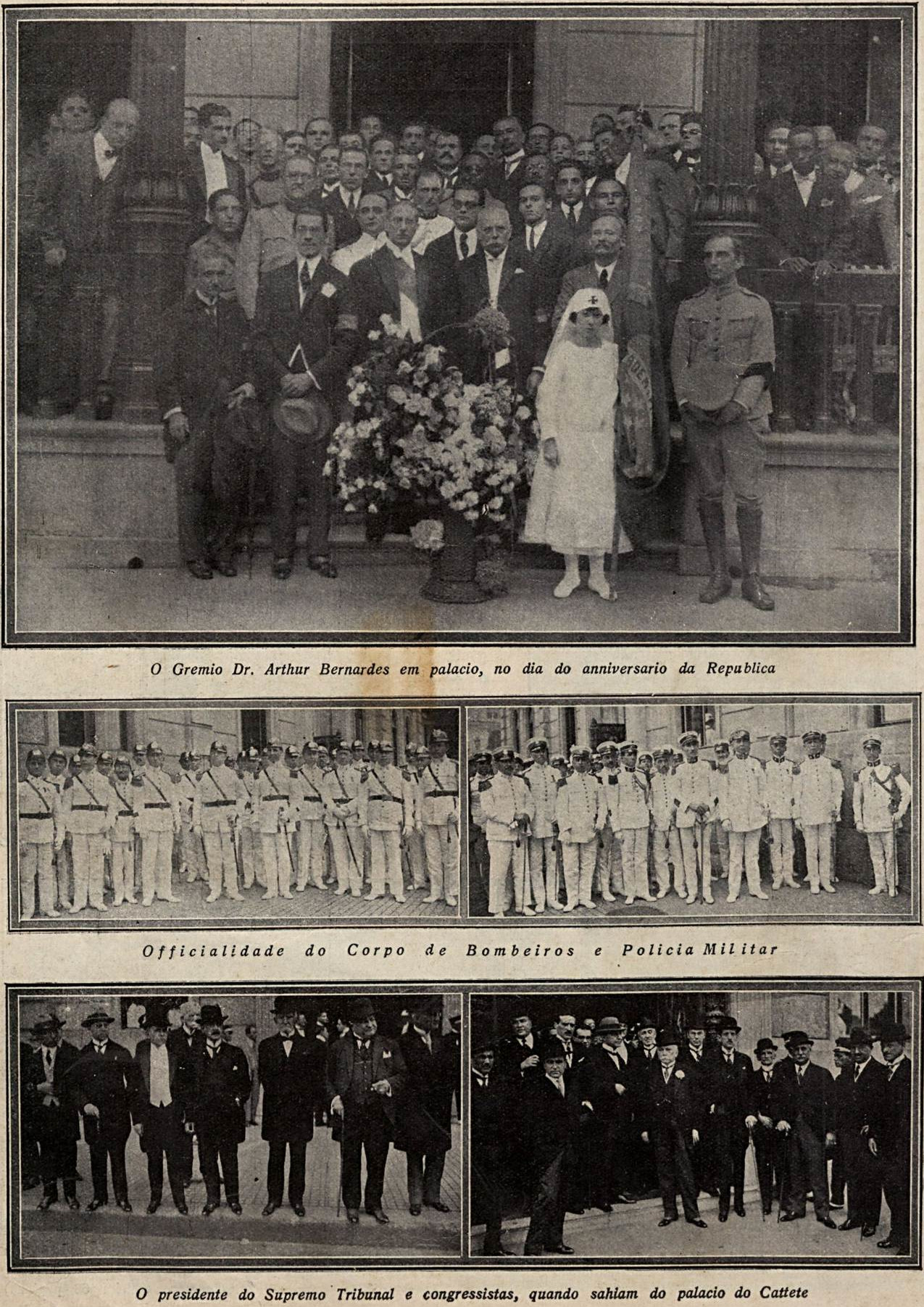
Military officers and politicians show solidarity with Bernardes on 15 November

Parallel to the battles in São Paulo and other cities, the new state of emergency was more repressive than previous periods. News about the revolts were censored. Mass arrests without investigation filled Rio's prisons. The prisoners were journalists, workers sympathetic to the revolution, especially anarchists, but also beggars, unemployed people and others captured in "canoes": sweeps of certain streets at specific times. Political prisoners shared prison cells with common criminals. Conditions could be very precarious, and due to lack of space, many remained in the holds of prison ships or on islands in Guanabara Bay. Arrests and torture of rebels, supporters, suspects and their relatives were repeated throughout the country.

Many conspiracies were discovered by political police before they materialized. Bomb attacks occurred in September, and on 20 October the police arrested Protógenes Guimarães, head of a revolutionary movement in the navy. On 4 November, rebels took control of the battleship São Paulo, which, however, was almost out of ammunition as a precautionary measure, and could do nothing other than head into exile in Montevideo.

The government's biggest concern was in Rio Grande do Sul, where a new revolt broke out at the end of October. On one side, the tenentists and the opposition from Rio Grande do Sul, and on the other, the state and federal governments. This revolt failed to threaten the state's largest military hub, Santa Maria. In western Paraná, the remnants of the revolt in São Paulo resisted in a long trench war against general Cândido Rondon, who commanded a force of 12 thousand men.

On 15 November, the anniversary of the Proclamation of the Republic and the second anniversary of Bernardes' term, there were many tributes to the president at the Catete Palace. Security measures were strict: only ministers and high-ranking figures were allowed to park in the garden's avenues, and even people passing by tram in front of the palace were searched. State governors made their loyalty clear. In July, the top brass of the Armed Forces also confirmed their support for the government. The tenentists could have the urban middle classes on their side, but they were completely abandoned by the political class, which closed ranks in defence of order, fearful of popular unrest. The federal and state governments, the rural and urban oligarchies and a large part of the army formed a status quo united front. Empowered by the state of emergency, they were willing to sacrifice political liberalism to crush their enemies.

=== Umberto of Savoy's visit ===
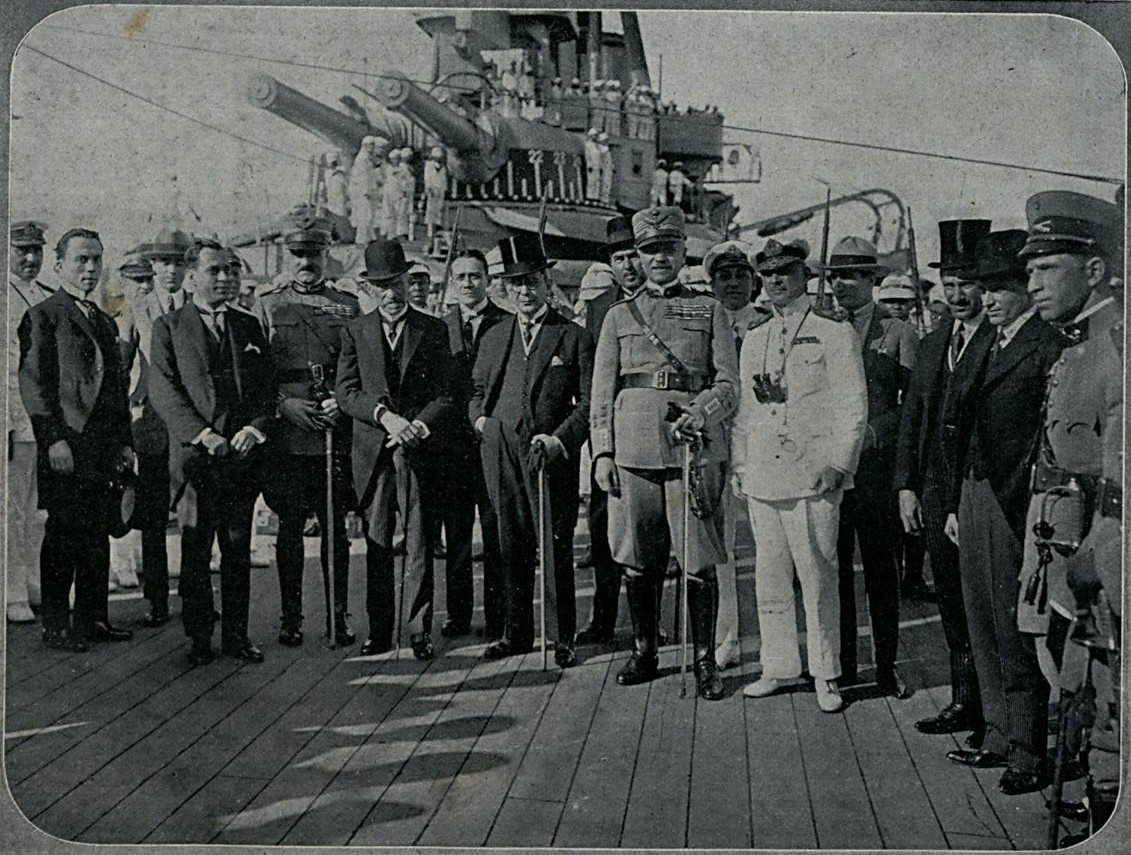
Umberto of Savoy, Pietro Badoglio and Félix Pacheco on board the battleship São Paulo

Salvador, Bahia, received official visits from prince Umberto of Savoy, heir to the Italian throne, on 26–30 July and 9–18 September. The Italian diplomatic mission visited Brazil and three other South American countries, Argentina, Chile and Uruguay, to represent Benito Mussolini's regime to the respective governments and the diaspora. The prince wanted to visit São Paulo, a logical destination due to the large concentration of Italian immigrants, but the ongoing revolt ruled out this option. Rio de Janeiro was also excluded, as it was still considered unstable. Bahia, on the other hand, was safe and the Calmon government enjoyed the confidence of the president. The foreign minister, aboard the battleship São Paulo, represented the Brazilian government on the second visit.

Despite advertising to attract more immigrants, Italian immigration to São Paulo decreased significantly between 1925 and 1929. Pietro Badoglio, the Italian ambassador to Brazil, was not pleased with the transfer of the prince's trip and much less so with the government's bombing of São Paulo, which heavily hit Italian neighbourhoods: Mooca and Brás. Foreign consulates in Brazil received criticism and requests for neutrality from their citizens during the 1924 revolt, often without response. The destruction of British property and the censorship of American journalists completed the damage caused by the revolts on Brazil's image abroad. The country's image was eroded by the contrast between internal authoritarianism and active participation in the League of Nations, where Brazilian diplomats worked on issues such as the distribution of passports to refugees and ethnic minorities. In 1924 Brazil became the first country to operate a legation with embassy status in Geneva.

=== Deflationary adjustment ===
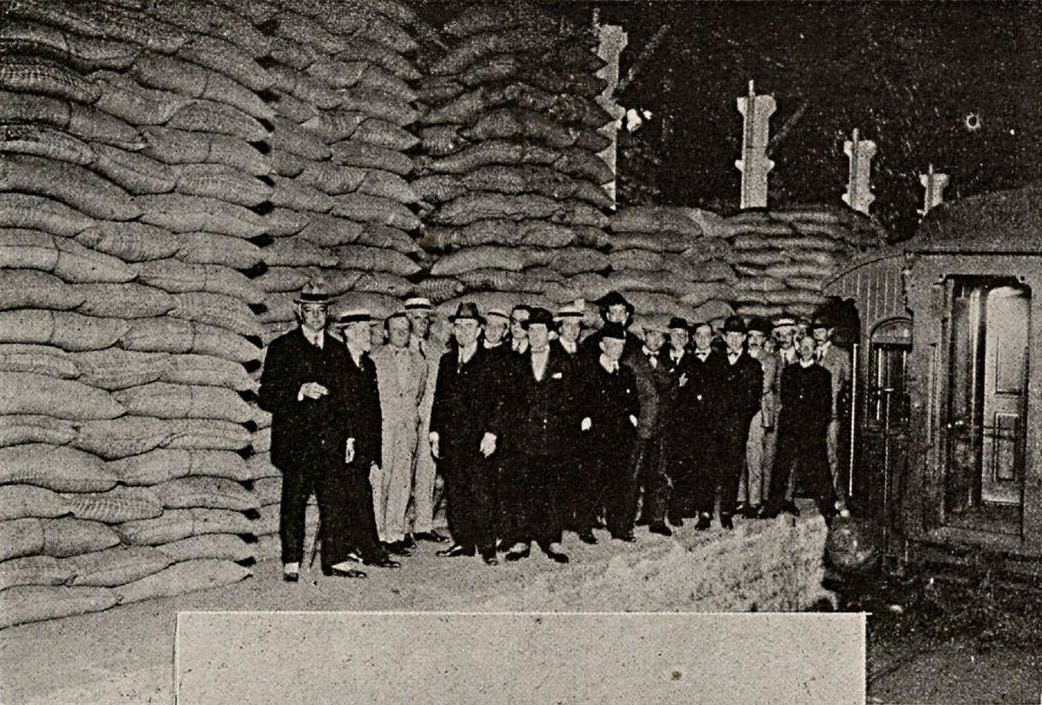
Coffee held in one of the "regulatory warehouses" in 1924

Direction of the country's economic policy took a turn at the end of 1924: in November the federal government abandoned the defence of coffee, leaving the task to the states (especially São Paulo), and on 27 December Sampaio Vidal and Cincinato Braga were dismissed and replaced by Aníbal Freire, from Pernambuco, at the Ministry of Finance, and James Darcy, from Rio Grande do Sul, at the Bank of Brazil. The immediate pretext was the criticism received by the contract between the federal government and the Bank of Brazil in the Chamber of Deputies' Finance and Justice Committee, on the 17th. Deputy Aníbal Freire pointed out that several provisions of the contract were not based on the decree that established it. Sampaio Vidal and Cincinato Braga, who had already been questioned by the president about money issuance, asked for dismissal. The government broke with São Paulo on the economy, without losing them as allies in politics, as Minas Gerais and São Paulo shared immediate interests.

The appointments and the abandonment of the federal defence of coffee were complementary. Coffee prices were rising and the crop was smaller, but coffee growers, with little liquidity and waiting for stocks to be released, wanted a new valuation method. At the same time, the government was failing to meet its economic goals. Inflation continued to rise, and food prices were worrying. The growth in exports was offset by the parallel rise in imports. The Bank of Brazil's issuances reached 400 billion réis in June, although not directly for the payment of coffee notes. Spending on military revolts exceeded the legal limit (600 billion) and circulation reached 753 billion at the beginning of October.

Bernardes began to disagree with the defenders of money issuance in the old debate about coffee valuation. The Bank of Brazil's behaviour was condemned by defenders of orthodox economics, including deputy Antônio Carlos. In January, Antônio Carlos revealed to Montagu that Bernardes disapproved of the coffee valuation scheme and blamed money issuance for the devaluation of the exchange rate. The Montagu Mission agreed with the criticisms of the defence of coffee, as it subjected the money in circulation to strong and random pressures. Letting the Bank of Brazil continue to issue would prevent a future reopening of negotiations with the British. Without informing Sampaio Vidal and Cincinato Braga, Bernardes and orthodox politicians planned deflationary measures. The support received from the political class after the military revolts gave the president room to implement unpopular policies.

The new economic policy was strongly recessive. The Bank of Brazil raised the interest rate on lending operations to other banks and reduced their amount. Treasury bills were withdrawn from circulation. Surplus money was incinerated. A monetary contraction on that scale had not been seen since Joaquim Murtinho's tenure as Finance Minister, at the turn of the century. Monetary restrictions were accompanied by a reinforced tightening against budget deficit. In January 1925, most public works projects were suspended.

Eight federal coffee warehouses were sold to the state of São Paulo, which founded the São Paulo Institute for Permanent Coffee Defence. From December 1925, agreements between the states defined the product's shipment quotas. The federal government would still participate in coffee operations through a National Fund, financed by a road tax, to support state programmes.

== 1925 ==
=== Educational reform ===
In January 1925, Bernardes enacted the so-called Rocha Vaz Reform, which sought to centralize and standardize secondary and higher schools. The reform established the National Department of Education, considered by some authors to be a precursor to the current Ministry of Education, although its attributions were limited. The National Congress diluted the reform's changes, whose strongest effect ended up being just the moralization of teaching through the inclusion of moral and civic education in the secondary education curriculum. The government agreed with the Church that political, economic and social issues were, deep down, moral.

=== Exile of prisoners ===
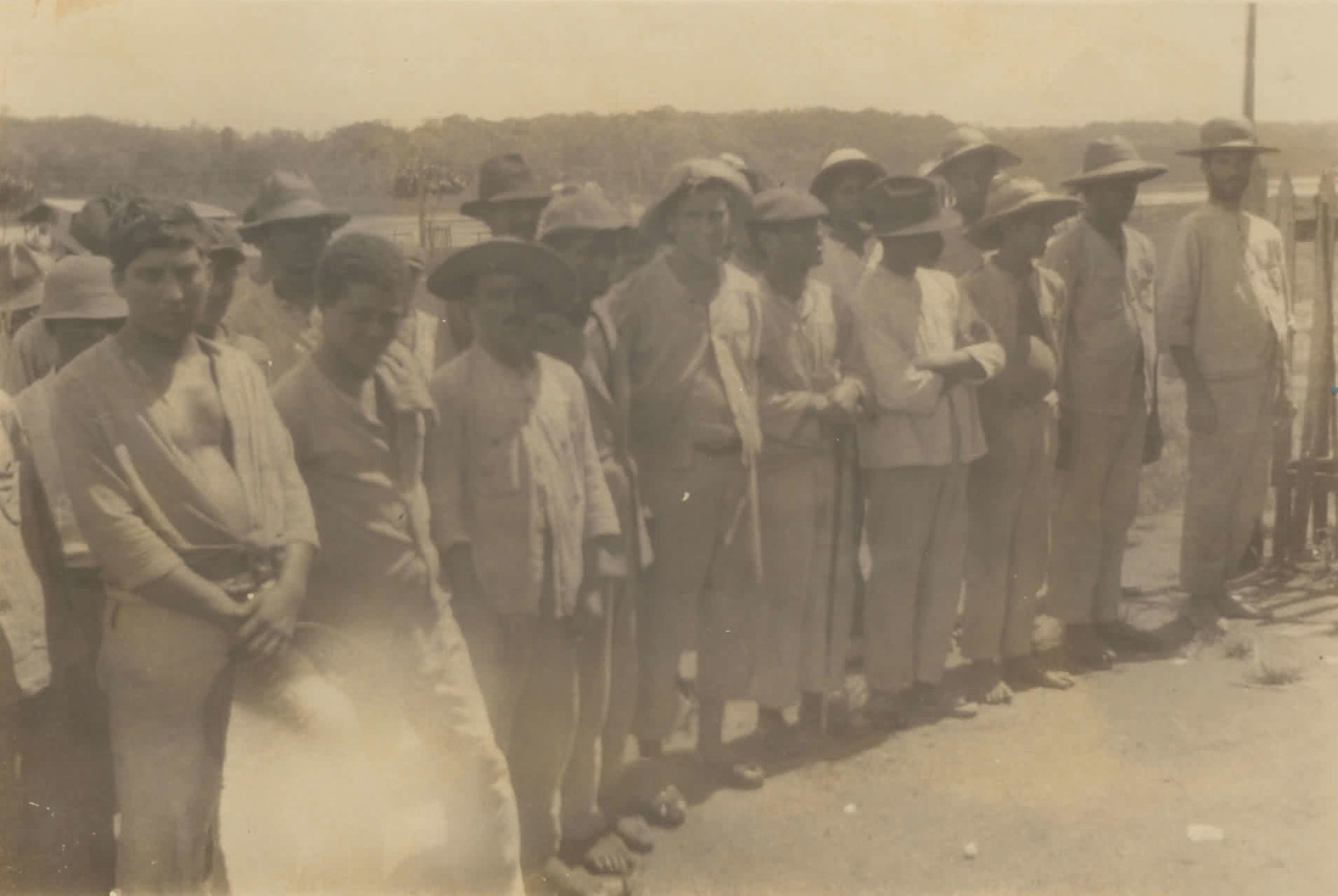
Sick prisoners in Clevelândia

The year 1925 began with a state of emergency in force in the Federal District, Rio de Janeiro, São Paulo, Mato Grosso, Paraná, Santa Catarina, Rio Grande do Sul, Sergipe, Pará and Amazonas. The addition of Bahia, on 21 February, left the state of emergency at its maximum territorial extent, simultaneously in force in the capital and ten states. Again there was an extension until the end of the year. Congress voted massively in favour of the state of emergency, and according to historian Neil Macaulay, it "said amen to everything". But its minority was the last organized opposition, presenting amnesty bills and using the platform to report on the revolts and denounce torture of prisoners.

The year also began with the recent transformation of two remote and isolated places into political prisons: the oceanic island of Trindade and the Cleveland Agricultural Centre, on Brazil's border with French Guiana. (Note: In Trindade "the first political, civilian and military prisoners arrived in December 1924. The first ship with prisoners for Clevelândia arrived at the Oyapock River on 26 December.) Clevelândia was suggested by the minister of agriculture as a way of keeping quiet the insistent requests for habeas corpus. He argued based on the Prophylaxis Service of Pará, which attested to the healthiness of the place. Biographer Bruno de Almeida Magalhães claimed that "some prisoners perished", but "the legend about Clevelândia" has already been "unquestionably refuted". The specialized bibliography contradicts this defence, demonstrating a high mortality rate among prisoners due to ill-treatment and tropical diseases. Carlo Romani even described Clevelândia as a concentration camp. (Note: "In the report Journey to the Cleveland Colonial Nucleus, produced by the Bernardes government, it is stated that, of the 946 prisoners, 408 were from Catanduvas, 419 were from Rio de Janeiro and 119 were from Amazonas. Of the total, 491 died and 262 escaped, and the most common diseases in the prison were bacillary dysentery, malaria and tuberculosis". Brito, Edson Machado de (2008). Do sentido aos significados do presídio de Clevelândia do Norte: repressão, resistência e disputa política no debate da imprensa (PDF) (Thesis). Pontifícia Universidade Católica de São Paulo. p. 31.)

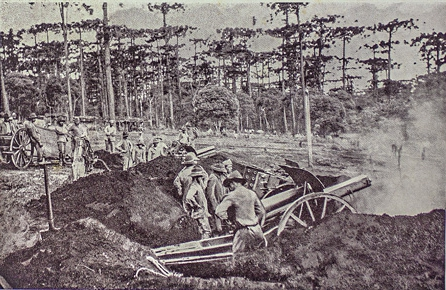
Loyalist artillery in action in Catanduvas

Most deaths in Clevelândia were due to bacillary dysentery brought by war prisoners from Catanduvas, in the Paraná Campaign. Waging a conventional trench warfare, the defenders of Catanduvas exposed themselves to the loyalist army, which employed the same tactics. The government, unlike the tenentists, had "ammunition factories, money factories and enough illiterates to throw against our machine guns", in the words of captain Luís Carlos Prestes, commander of the remnants of the revolt in Rio Grande do Sul.

=== The Prestes Column ===
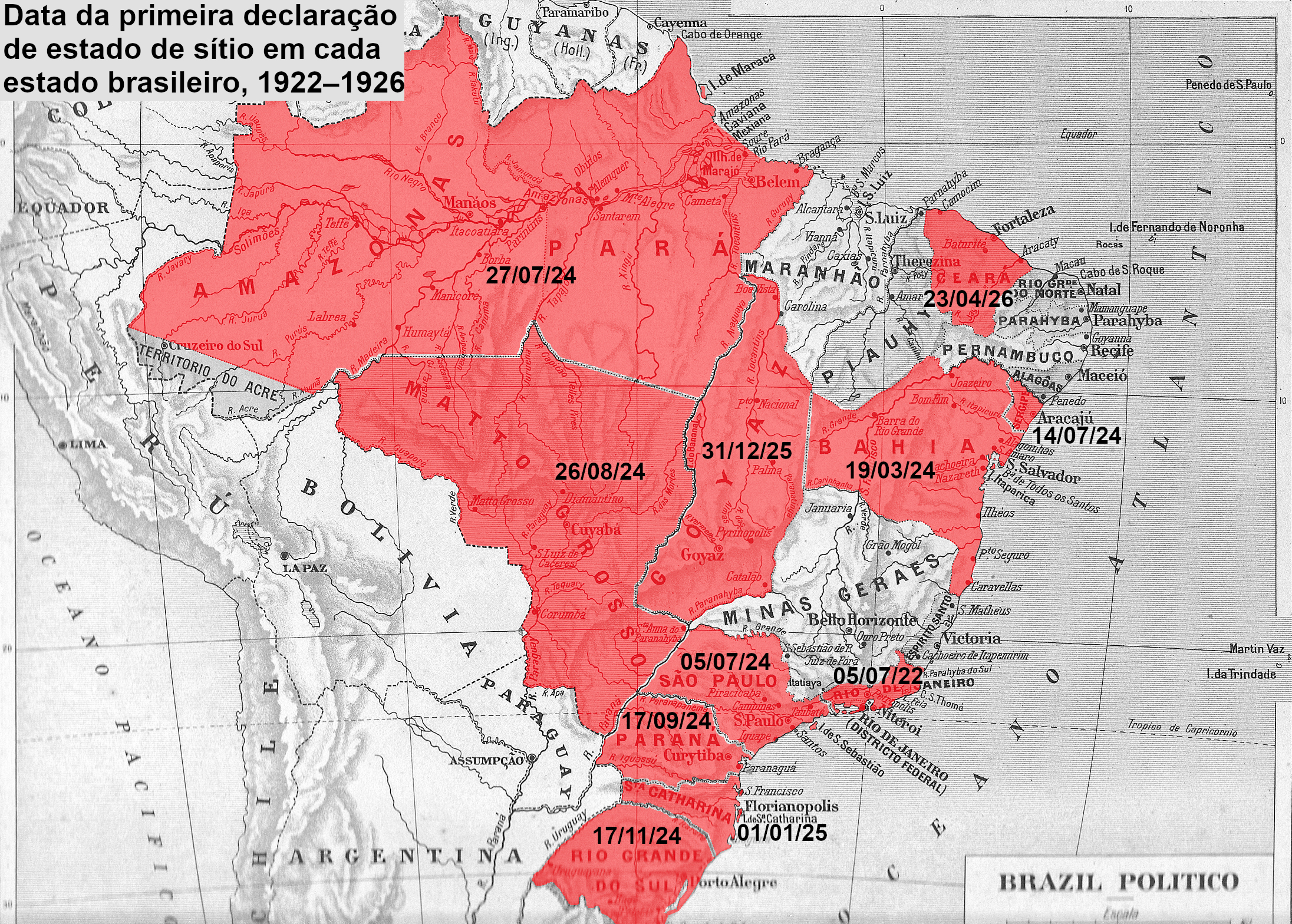
Date of the first promulgation of the state of emergency in each state

The government's victory in Catanduvas allowed the expulsion of the other tenentists from Brazilian territory. On 29 April, the remnants of the revolts in São Paulo and Rio Grande do Sul escaped to Paraguay. The Bernardes government "emerged from its severe trial stronger than ever". The president received from the foreign minister a telegram from general Rondon announcing that "order has been reestablished in Paraná and Santa Catarina and, perhaps, throughout Brazil". Bernardes was not so optimistic. In May the rebels, reorganized into the "Prestes Column", crossed the border into Mato Grosso and reignited the war. With 800 to 1,400 men, the column did not have enough strength to march against Rio de Janeiro. Deep in the vast and disconnected interior of the country, the rebels evaded the loyalist pursuing columns, which sent thousands of soldiers into campaign.

At the end of June, pursued by Bertoldo Klinger's loyalists, the column entered Goiás. In August, planning to enter Bahia along the east bank of the São Francisco River, the column entered Minas Gerais, but turned back when it encountered loyalist forces on the river. In the Northeast, the rebels hoped to receive civil and military support to strengthen themselves for a possible offensive against Rio de Janeiro, taking advantage of the recent civil war in Bahia. Governor Calmon had tried to extirpate the power of colonel Horácio de Matos, lord of a "state within the state" in Chapada Diamantina. An expedition of a thousand jagunços and Public Force soldiers was repelled by Matos' militiamen in Lençóis, and in February 1925 federal intermediation ended the conflict. Bernardes, linked to Matos through minister Francisco Sá, used the minister of agriculture, the governor's brother, to pressure for an end to the conflict. Horácio de Matos imposed his conditions, humiliating the state government.

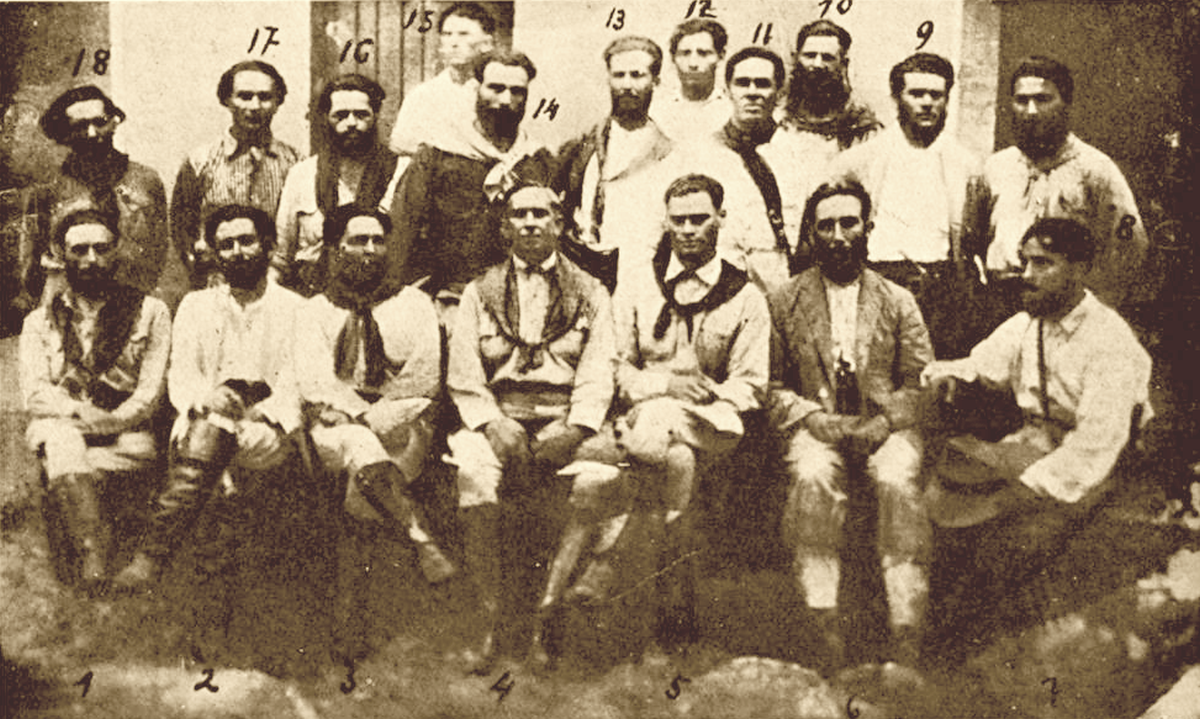
Leaders of the Prestes Column

In November the column entered Maranhão, even foreseeing the possibility of an "effective and lasting possession" of the state. The following month, it invaded Piauí, anticipating a capture of the state capital, Teresina, against the demoralized loyalists. 90% of the population left the city, and general João Gomes proposed abandoning it and reconquering it with artillery, in a similar way to São Paulo. Governor Matias Olímpio de Melo persevered in resisting in his capital and telegraphed to Rio de Janeiro, turning to Pacheco and fellow Piauí's congressmen to put pressure on Bernardes. Encountering strong resistance, constant rain, and a malaria epidemic, the rebels lifted the siege on 30 December and continued east.

=== Survival of the regime ===
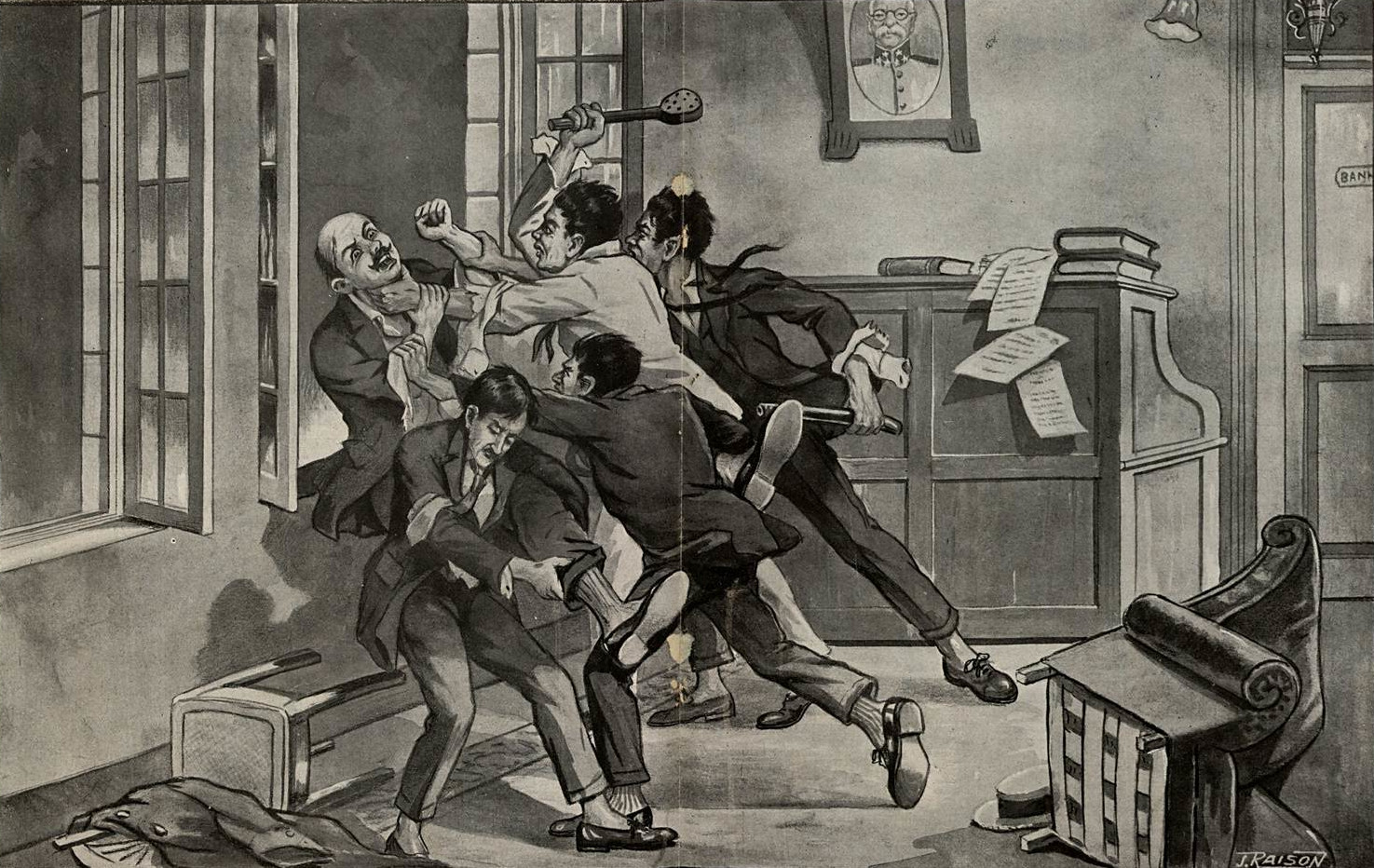
Death of businessman Conrado Niemeyer at the 4th Police Bureau, according to the prosecution report

Teresina was the only large city attacked by the Prestes Column. The rebels, pushed into the countryside, avoiding civilization and military strongholds, without threatening the federal capital. The Bernardes government remained in total control. The army, since Catanduvas, was no longer a serious danger. What the column achieved was to discredit the army and the central government. The officers of the federal force showed little courage to fight against their fellow rebel comrades. Only state forces and patriotic battalions gained prestige. The population resisted by evading the military lottery: 73,250 young men were called up to the army in 1925, of which 59,638 did not present themselves. Historiography usually narrates the Prestes Column in terms of the failure of the army's persecution. But the loyalist campaign also had another aspect: massive federal contingents operated in regions almost devoid of agents of central power. The federal government found itself empowered to intervene in interior affairs.

Rio de Janeiro continued to be the main source of concern. In May, army deserters attempted to take over the 3rd Infantry Regiment, a mere five kilometres from the Catete Palace. In July, businessman Conrado Niemeyer, arrested on charges of supplying explosives to conspirators, allegedly committed suicide by jumping out of one of the Central Police windows. The fear of conspiracies even brought down the head of the 4th Police Bureau, who was interrogated and expelled in September for a suspicious trip to São Paulo. Carlos Reis was replaced by Francisco Chagas.

In the rest of the country, small revolts still broke out in solidarity with the Prestes Column. Still in May, incidents in São Paulo and Barretos. In October, a border incursion by exiled rebels into Rio Grande do Sul. Brazilian consulates in Bolivia, Paraguay, Argentina and Uruguay collaborated with intelligence agents from the Armed Forces to monitor exiled tenentist communities and curb arms smuggling.

== 1926 ==
=== Northeastern campaigns ===
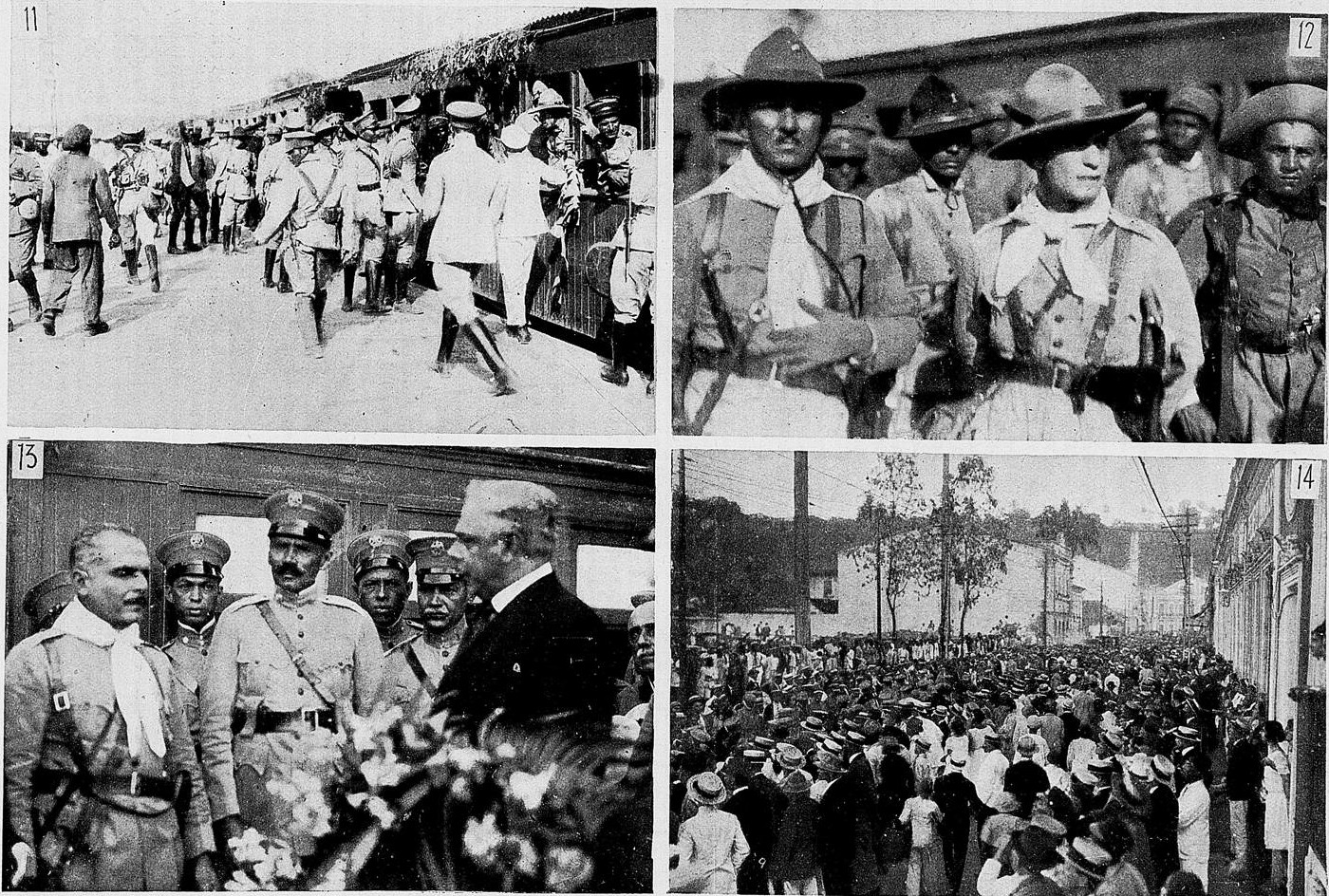
Return to Salvador of a Public Force battalion that fought the tenentists

At the beginning of 1926, the Prestes Column crossed Ceará, Rio Grande do Norte, Paraíba and Pernambuco, reaching the border with Bahia, on the banks of the São Francisco River, on 25 February. The month was a tense atmosphere in Recife, with military patrols on the streets and rumours of a rebel invasion or the cancellation of Carnival. Artists and intellectuals from five northeastern states (including Gilberto Freyre's speech) held a congress in the capital of Pernambuco to discuss their region's decadence. On the 18th, shortly after Ash Wednesday, Cleto Campelo, a lieutenant of the Recife garrison, and 26 other revolutionaries started their own revolt and tried to join the Prestes Column, but were intercepted in Gravatá. The previous month, the leaders of the 1926 Sergipe revolt, imprisoned in the same barracks where they made the first attempt, rebelled once again, but were immediately defeated.

General command of the loyalist forces in the Northeastern theatre fell to general João Gomes, replaced in April by Álvaro Mariante. The government turned to all possible allies — priests, local oligarchs and warlords, and jagunços. Even the cangaceiro Lampião received the rank of army captain, embarrassing the opposition in Congress and the governments of four states that had signed an agreement to hunt him down. Modern weapons were freely handed to irregular forces (patriotic battalions), and in this way, Mauser rifles used by the army fell into the hands of criminals. The year 1926 was a heyday for countryside banditry.

The war was increasingly violent. In Piancó, Paraíba, the rebels executed the political leader and leader of the loyalist resistance, Father Aristides. Groups of jagunços set up ambushes against the Prestes Column. Government propaganda labeled the rebels as bandits and thugs. In much of the country, populations received the column with apprehension or even hostility, due to its requests for food and supplies. Both sides committed violence against the populations of the countryside. In June, an American consul commented that in Bahia, "federal and state troops committed depredations far worse than any attributed to the rebels". In a letter to Luís Carlos Prestes, Father Cícero Romão Batista recognized the patriotism of the rebellion, but recommended its surrender: "you must still reflect on widowhood and orphanhood which, with penalizing abundance, spread everywhere".

When it attempted an incursion into northern Minas Gerais, from May to April, the column encountered government reinforcements, concentrated across the densest railway network in that state, and had to retreat. In secret, its leadership decided to emigrate. In June, the government reinforced Salvador, informed of the presence of rebels 170 km from the city, but this was a screening operation. Maneuvering through Pernambuco, Piauí and the extreme northwest of Bahia, the rebels entered Goiás on 20 August.

=== Command changes in the police ===
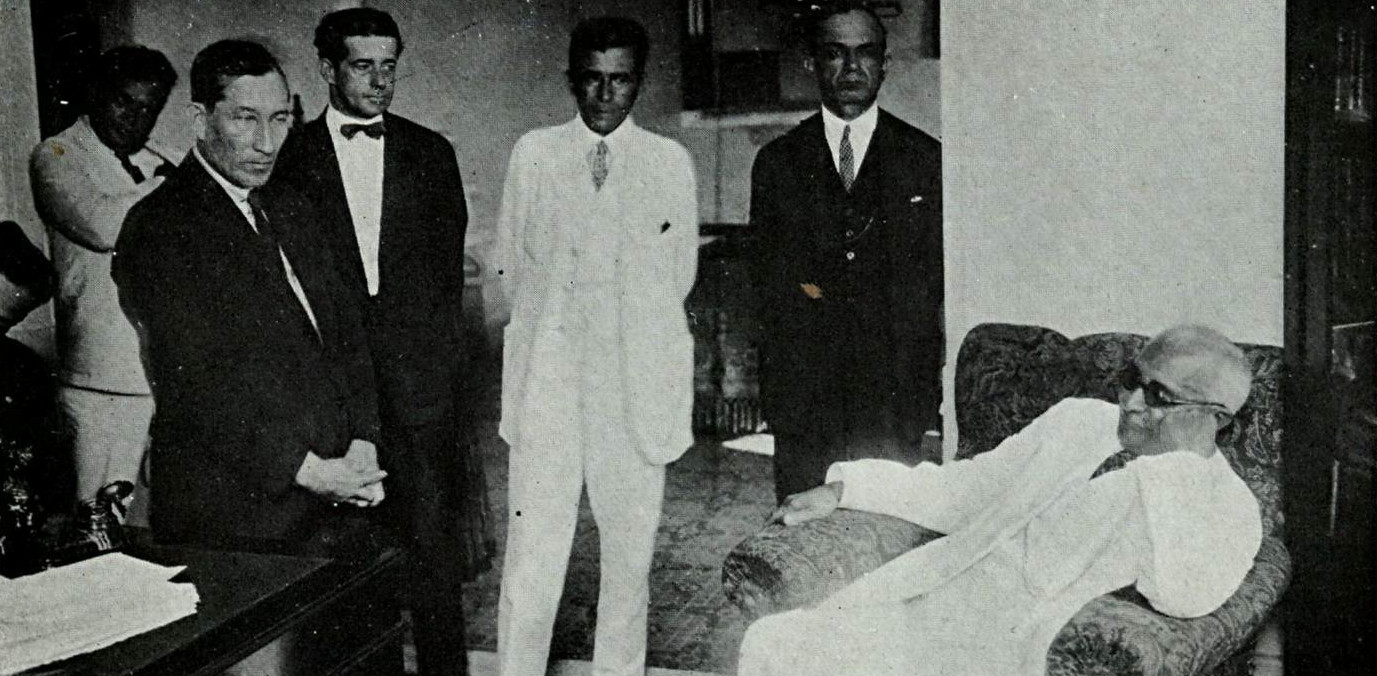
Marshal Fontoura, retired, testifies about the Niemeyer case in 1927

On 8 April, the newspapers announced the dismissal of Carneiro de Fontoura as police chief of the Federal District. The reason was his dismissal of Renato Bittencourt, from the 17th Police Bureau. Under orders from the Minister of Justice, Bittencourt had repressed points of the Jogo do Bicho hitherto untouched by the police. Marshal Fontoura claimed that the dismissal was purely disciplinary, but he did not convince Bernardes. A dossier had reached the president's hands linking the marshal to the great bosses of Jogo do Bicho, such as João Pallut, Pereira, Cavanellas, Cropalatos, Metelle and Alvin. His monthly bribes, according to the dossier, were distributed among the highest levels of the Central Police. Mário de Lacerda, 2nd Auxiliary Police Chief, was appointed by the criminal Guimarães das Linhas, in favour of whom he protected the clubs and large societies that hosted gambling. João Pallut, according to chief Bittencourt's testimony, met Fontoura in the main hall of the Central Police. Soon afterwards, the marshal nullified the transfers of police officers requested by Bittencourt.

Officially, the dismissal was "by request". Fontoura retaliated with a letter to the president, with copies given to newspapers, in which he refused the "generous offer he [Bernardes] made to me of a commission in Europe as a reward for the services I rendered to the country". The 4th Police Bureau monitored Fontoura's home. Bernardes appointed as the new police chief the former criminal prosecutor of São Paulo Carlos da Silva Costa, an experienced public prosecutor and responsible for prosecuting those involved in the 1924 revolt. For the government, he was a cultured man, who abhorred violence; to the opposition, "a darkness man".

The situation was calmer in Rio de Janeiro, and the new police chief sought to calm public opinion and resume routine police work, without employing the powers of the state of emergency. Still in force, the emergency was extended until the end of the year. For the 4th Auxiliary Police Bureau, Silva Costa appointed lieutenant colonel Bandeira de Mello, critical of previous administrations: "the political police among us caused an almost complete paralysis of the true investigation work, and had the effect of relaxing discipline". The number of conspiracies decreased significantly in 1926, but the American military attaché commented that "the army's air service remains paralyzed", as "Mr. Bernardes does not have confidence in a large army contingent and does not want to take the risk of being bombed".

=== Withdrawal from the League of Nations ===
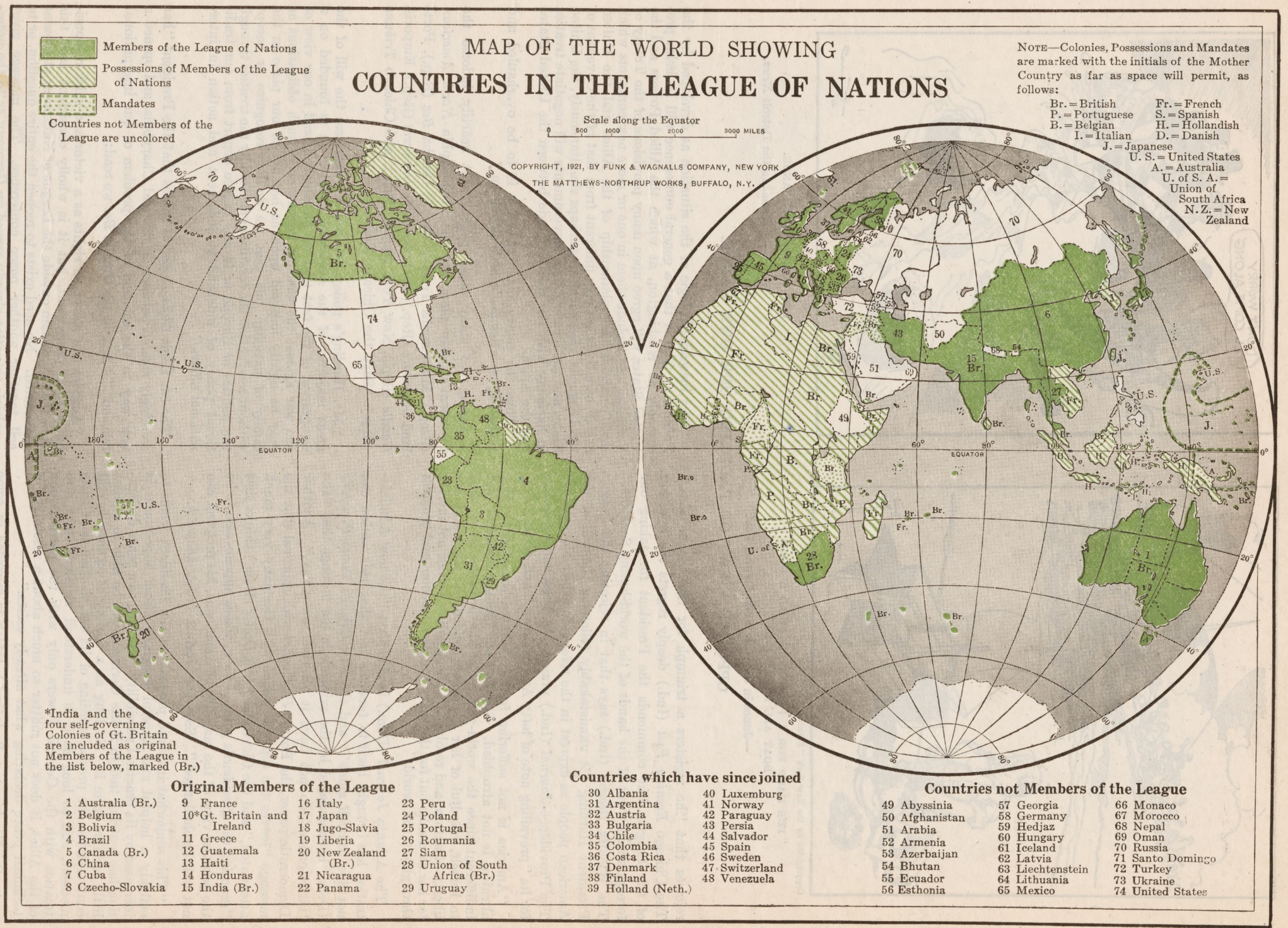
Member countries of the League of Nations in 1921, before Brazil's withdrawal and Germany's admission

The biggest change in Brazilian foreign relations during the Bernardes presidency was the withdrawal from the League of Nations, on 10 June 1926. This was the culmination and defeat of Brazil's campaign to obtain a permanent seat on the institution's Deliberative Council. Germany's request to join the League (and the council) in 1925 was the opportunity that Bernardes chose to seek a permanent seat. As a form of pressure, Brazil announced its veto on the admission of Germany in March, arguing based on equality between nations in the League and criticism of what was seen as the "Europeanization" of the organization. Brazil claimed to represent the American continent, but diplomats from Latin American countries asked for the veto to be lifted. Bernardes overestimated the country's importance, as Germany's diplomatic normalization in the Locarno Treaties was a much greater concern for the European powers, who treated Brazil with disdain and disinterest. The Council formed a commission to reorganize its composition, in practice, to exclude Brazil.

The next move was the threat of leaving the League, in order to discredit the organization. Brazil seemed to have some chances, as France originally supported its candidacy for a permanent seat until changing its stance for geopolitical reasons. When the threat was not taken seriously, the country had to keep its word and leave the League. According to the organization's rules, the withdrawal would only take place two years later. The bibliography on the subject was mainly based on the president's opponents, and concluded that the Brazilian exit from the League was a diplomatic fiasco, in which Bernardes, driven by considerations of internal public opinion, imposed his will against the recommendation of diplomats. More recent studies argue that the president was informed about geopolitics, wanting to show abroad that Brazil had its own opinion, and that the fiasco also involved the international system as a whole. According to biographer Bruno de Almeida Magalhães, the moment "was perhaps the only time that Bernardes enjoyed popularity" during his term.

=== Results in the economy ===
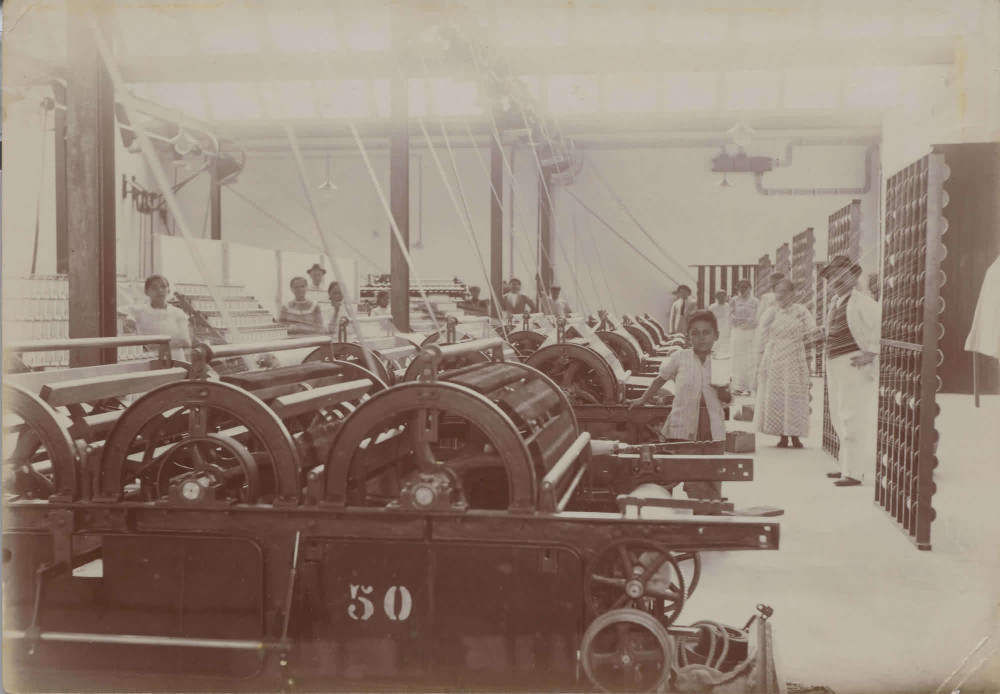
Thread factory in Pedra Branca, Alagoas

Productive activity bore the burden of the recessive policy of 1925–1926. Industrial production, recovering since 1922, stagnated at the 1924 level, which had already been low due to the fighting in São Paulo. Imports of capital goods, also growing since 1923, plummeted 26% in 1926. Numerous bankruptcies occurred in Rio de Janeiro and São Paulo. But the orthodox adjustment fulfilled its objectives: the exchange rate appreciated by 40% between August and October 1925 alone and prices fell by 18.1% in 1926, after an average growth of 17.2% in the previous four years.

This was not purely a merit of the government. International trade and investment were recovering, coffee prices were high, Brazil had a balance of payments surplus and foreign credit opportunities were opening up. Foreign loans remained inaccessible in 1925; according to the British ambassador, there was an Anglo-American agreement "not to lend money to Brazil until its internal position improves". From May to June of the following year, having proven its fiscal and monetary discipline, the Brazilian government obtained a loan of 60 million US dollars from Dillon Read bankers, from New York, to pay off the Treasury's debts and provide the Bank of Brazil with international reserves.

Despite austerity, the government managed to encourage agriculture, especially the production of cotton, whose prices were high, and tobacco. The official discourse recalled that cotton was not only an export product, but also a raw material for the national industry. On 19 July 1926, the government increased the import tax on sewing threads, concerned with competition faced by the Cia. Agro-Fabril Mercantil factory, in the municipality of Água Branca, Alagoas. Institutions such as the National Museum, Botanical Garden and Biological Institute had their economic and scientific side promoted. The government created experimental stations for cotton, tobacco and wheat crops, three farms for seed dissemination, two forestry gardens and eight agricultural patronages.

Financial difficulties slowed the construction of railways, but the government still tried to stimulate the sector by charging "railway obligations", an additional 10% on the current tariffs. This fee financed several government incentives for the acquisition of rolling stock and tracks. 3,000 kilometres of railways were built during the period. The presidential messages to Congress also mentioned the measures studied to decongest cabotage and international shipping ports. As for highways, Bernardes preferred that they were built by the states, but facilitated by the federal government.

Brazil's Gross Domestic Product (GDP) grew at an annual average of 3.7% in the quadrennium 1922–1926. According to statistics gathered in 1988, the budget deficit of 456.1 billion réis in 1922 fell to 311 billion in 1923, 41.4 billion in 1924 and 18.4 billion in 1925, rising to 219.9 billion in 1926. The exchange rate in pence per milreis was 6.56 in November 1922, fell to 4.84 in November of the following year and reached a maximum of 7.75 in July 1926. The cost of living in Rio de Janeiro, as a percentage of the 1939 value, was 67 in 1922, rose to 114.6 until 1925 and fell to 93.9 in 1926.

=== Constitutional reform ===
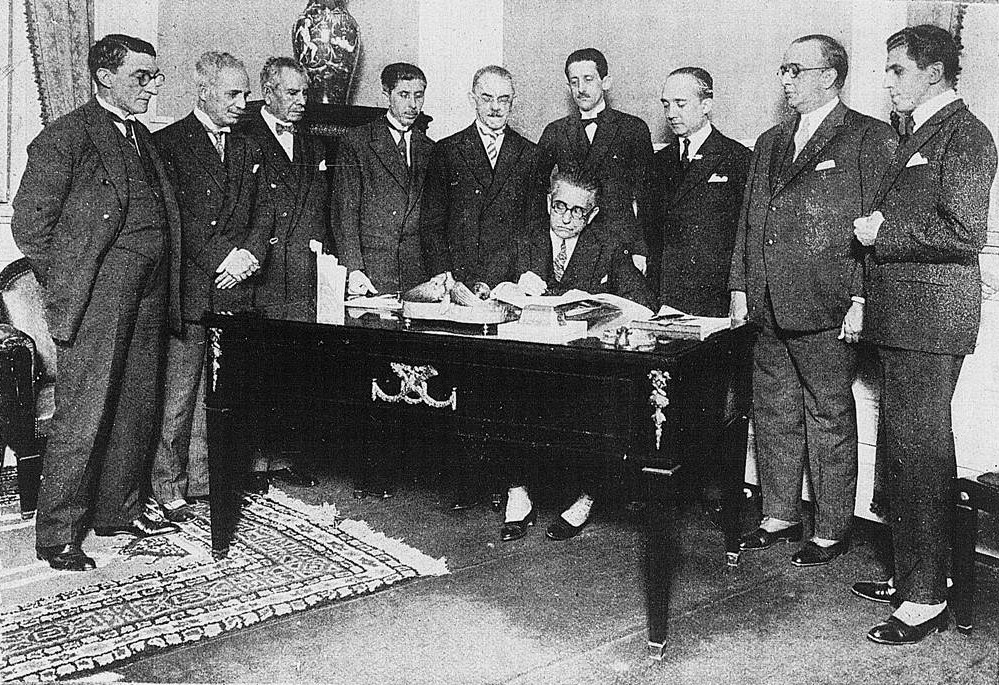
Vice president Estácio Coimbra signing the amendments in the Senate

On 3 September 1926, Congress approved the only revision to the 1891 Constitution, having been processed in Congress in two rounds, in 1925 and 1926, under a full state of emergency, military revolts and presidential succession. The topic did not move public opinion, but it was of interest to the government, business community, and the political class. Bernardes reversed the idea that the crisis would justify not changing the republican political status. The initiative came from him, who hosted the review committee meetings at Catete. For this reason, Senator Moniz Sodré called the proposal unconstitutional. But the opposition minority could do little, as it did not amount to a quarter of the deputies.

The Montagu Mission had a clear influence on the sections referring to the budget: the laws would have to deal exclusively with revenue and expenses allocated to services already created, prohibiting "budget tails". (Note: "Because they contained topics that were foreign to revenue forecasting and expense fixing, such as forecast salary increases for civil servants, increased taxes and tax exemptions, the budgets at that time were called long-tailed budgets.", or budget tails.) Likewise, Congress would be barred from granting unlimited credits. It received the prerogatives to legislate on labor issues, the organization of judicial court secretariats and the limitation of trade in the name of the public good. The president gained partial veto power over bills; until then, he could only sanction or veto bills entirely.

Foreigners lost the privilege of entering Brazil's territory without a passport in times of peace. They could no longer exploit mineral deposits of public interest and could be deported by the federal Executive if they were considered "dangerous to public order or harmful to the interests of the Republic". Bernardes cited the case of the immigrant battalions who fought for the 1924 rebels, calling them "ungrateful and dangerous guests".

In the name of relieving the work of the Supreme Court, the jurisdiction of federal courts was limited in relation to local courts, and of the Supreme Court as an appeals court in relation to the federal trial courts. Congress gained the prerogative to determine, through ordinary laws, when federal trial court sentences could be appealed to the Supreme Court, depriving the Judiciary of its independence to define the appeals system.

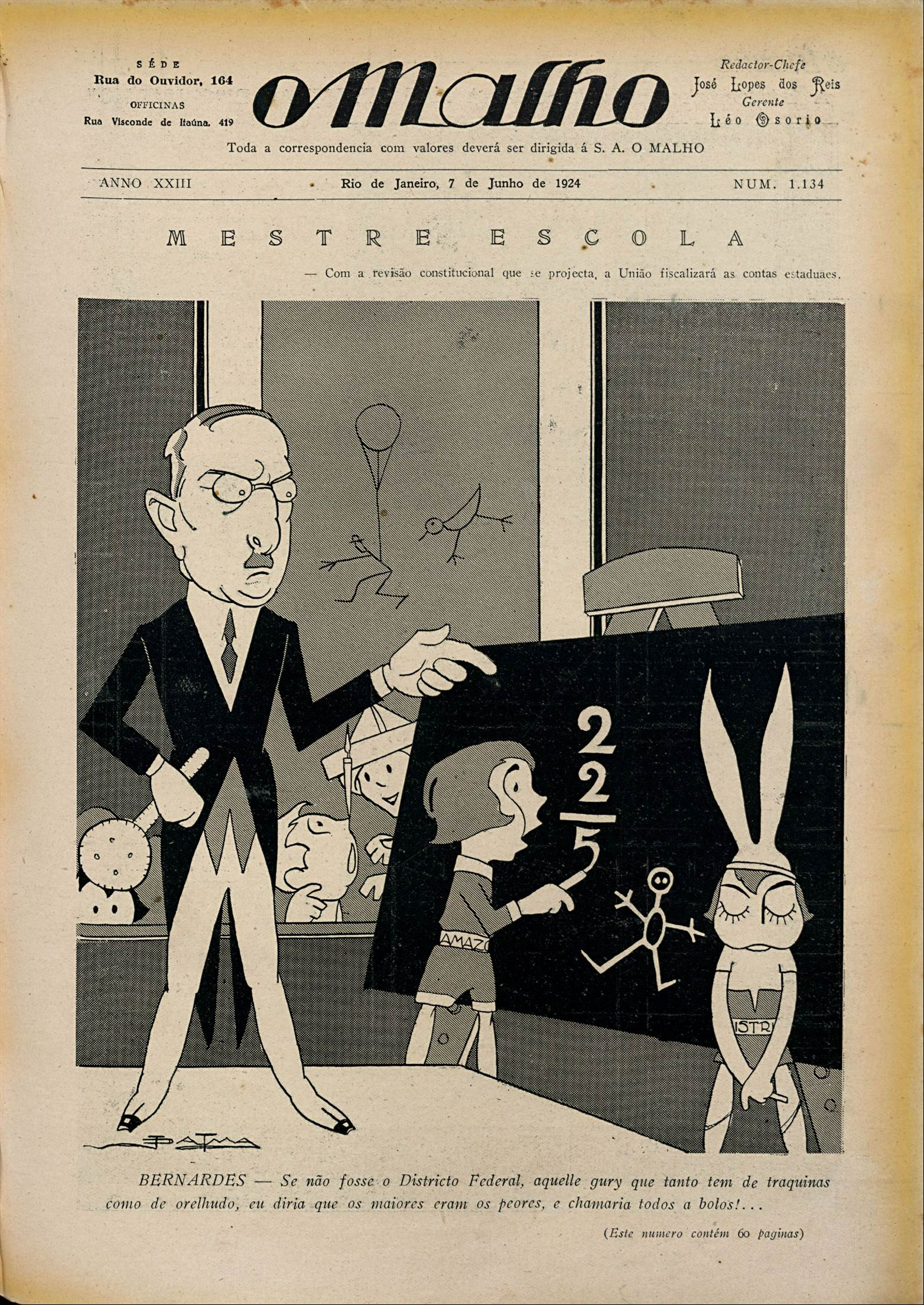
O Malho, June 1924: "With the proposed constitutional review, the Union will supervise state accounts"

According to the fifth paragraph of article 60, in the new wording: "No judicial recourse is permitted, to federal or local justice, against intervention in the States, the declaration of a state of emergency and the verification of powers, recognition, inauguration, legitimacy and loss of term of members of the Legislative or Executive Branch, federal or state wise". These cases were seen as political and arbitrary issues, within the jurisdiction of the Executive and Legislative branches. The second item of the sixth article, with very general provisions on federal intervention, was replaced by a list of cases in which it could be requested. Added to this, habeas corpus was restricted to its classic interpretation, protecting only freedom of movement. Brazilian doctrine had used this measure to protect all individual freedoms (freedom of the press, association and representation, inviolability of homes, etc.). An amendment rejected by the Senate went so far as to completely prohibit habeas corpus for those detained due to the state of emergency.

The amendments on the responsibilities of the Judiciary were controversial. On the one hand, congressmen such as senator Epitácio Pessoa argued that they would exempt the courts from tarnishing their impartiality with political interests. On the other, Moniz Sodré deemed possible abuses by the Judiciary, when involved in political matters, to be less worrying than abuses of authority by the Executive and Legislative branches under a state of emergency. Individuals harmed by these acts could no longer resort to habeas corpus. The Executive still ran the risk of later falling into high crimes and misdemeanors, but this would not restore the rights of the injured person.

The reform's result was the strengthening of central power and the president. Notably, the reform bill frequently mentioned "national integrity", unlike the drafters of the 1891 Constitution, who sought to emphasize the "federal republic". The Judiciary was weakened in favour of the two other branches, frustrating the liberals' ambition to use the Supreme Court as a "Moderating Power".

Part of the historiography states that the reform was used against the opposition, an accusation that historian Hélio Silva sought to refute by arguing that the reform was only achieved at the end of Bernardes' term, its more specific conditions for federal intervention made it difficult for subsequent governments to apply the measure and its narrower definition of habeas corpus was the norm in other countries. The main changes of the reform persisted in the following constitutions. In turn, Domingos Meirelles argued that the reform had the "purpose of eliminating acquired rights", in which "individual freedoms guaranteed by the Magna Carta of 1891 will be completely swept away". Historian Pedro Calmon praised the reform for breaking the "rigidity of the liberal Constitution of 1891, giving it a modern, social democratic flavor", despite the bad occasion, carrying it out "in a closed environment, without the enthusiasm of debates and the diversity of ideas".

=== Presidential succession ===
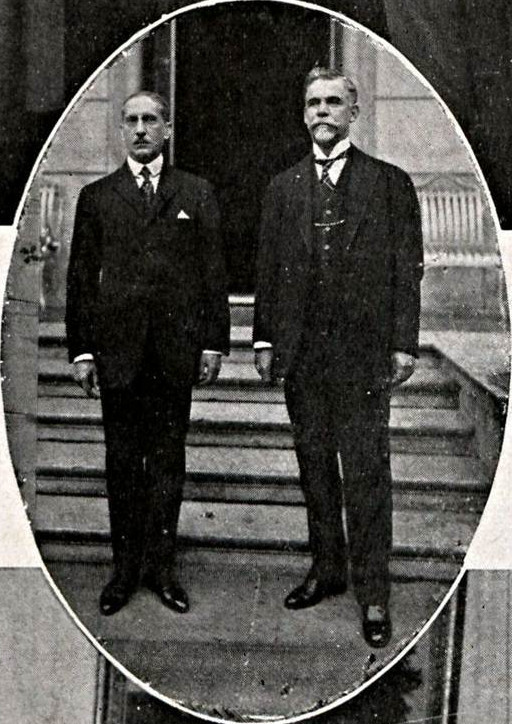
Bernardes and Washington Luís

The transition of power from Artur Bernardes to Washington Luís, on 15 November 1926, was peaceful, very different from what had happened four years earlier. Negotiations had begun late, in the third year of Bernardes' term. Catete, Minas Gerais and São Paulo were able to decide the successor with only minor resistance. Possible enemies were demobilized by repression. The leader of the majority in the Chamber of Deputies, the Minas Gerais deputy Antônio Carlos, went to São Paulo in May 1925. With governor Carlos de Campos, he arranged the candidacy of the São Paulo senator Washington Luís, an ally of Bernardes in 1922. The only problem came from Melo Viana, governor of Minas Gerais since 1924. Viana even imagined himself as Bernardes' candidate for president, criticizing Washington Luís' candidacy and rhetorically flirting with the opposition by suggesting an amnesty for the rebels. The president solved the problem by nominating him as a candidate for vice president. The Luís-Viana ticket was made official at a national convention, in September 1925, and elected on 1 March 1926, with 98% of the votes.

In the second half of the year, months before the end of Bernardes' presidency, journalists tested the limits of censorship. The Rio police confiscated copies of A Noite due to the audacious content of Viriato Corrêa's series of reports on the Prestes Column. In September, the Ministry of Justice banned reports covering the topic, but it was too late. The repercussions were immense and the tenentists solidified, at least in part of public opinion, an heroic and revolutionary image. The column continued its march, but these were its final moments. The government did not want to allow it to escape into exile and in September it deployed reinforcements from the Public Force of São Paulo in Goiás. It was not enough; On 22 October, the column had returned to Mato Grosso and was 400 kilometres from the border with Bolivia. Parallel to this campaign, a final revolt broke out in Rio Grande do Sul on 14 November, on the eve of Washington Luís' inauguration.

The inauguration once again took place under a state of emergency, as occurred four years ago. Of the 1,460 days of the quadrennium, 1,287 were spent under a state of emergency in force at some location in Brazil's territory, or 88.15% of the period. This was a longer period than the states of emergency declared by previous presidents combined. (Note: 295 days under Floriano Peixoto, 268 days under Hermes da Fonseca, 132 days under Epitácio Pessoa, 121 days under Rodrigues Alves, 104 days under Prudente de Morais and 71 days under Venceslau Brás, for a total of 991 days between 1889 and 1922. Aragão, Isabel Lopez (2021). Identidade militar-revoltosa e exílio: perseguição, articulação e resistência (1922-1930) (PDF) (Thesis). Programa de Pós-Graduação em História Social da Universidade do Estado do Rio de Janeiro. p. 105.) The new president's first moments eased political tensions: the government progressively ended the state of emergency, released political prisoners and suspended censorship. The Prestes Column went into exile. There was, however, no amnesty.
