= 4th Auxiliary Police Bureau =

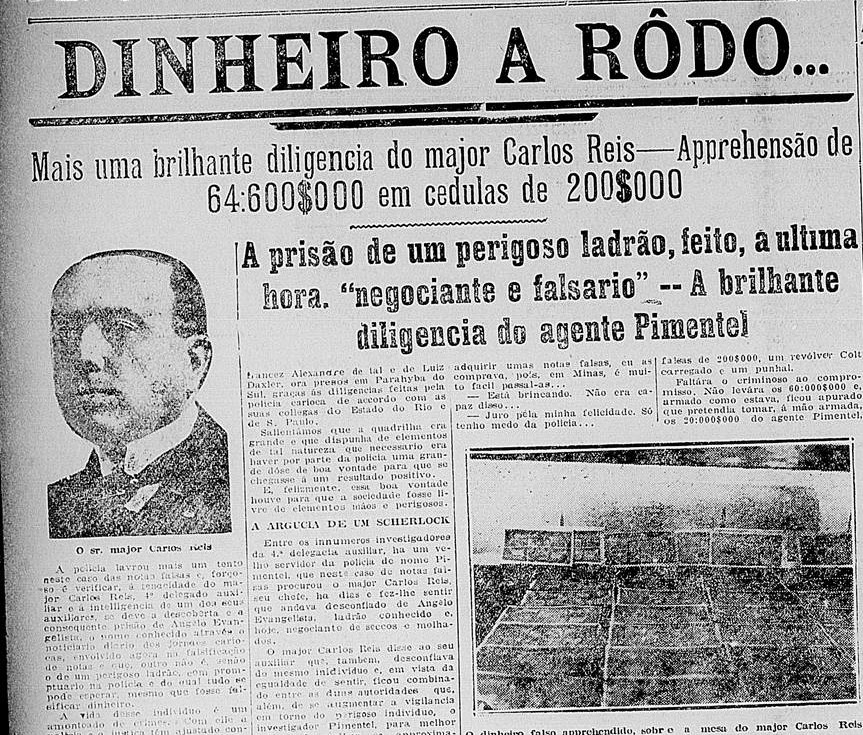
News about the seizure of counterfeit banknotes by major Carlos Reis, 4th auxiliary police chief, in June 1924

The 4th Auxiliary Police Bureau of the Civil Police of the Federal District was a Brazilian political and investigative police division that operated in Rio de Janeiro from 1922 to 1933. It was based in the Central Police Building, under the jurisdiction of the Chief of Police of the Federal District and the Ministry of Justice, while being politically directed by the Military Cabinet of the Presidency. Although its jurisdiction was limited to the Federal District, its investigators could operate in other states and even abroad. Succeeding the Inspectorate of Investigation and Public Security (1920) and preceding the Special Delegation of Political and Social Security (DESPS) (1933), the 4th Police Bureau was a precursor to Rio de Janeiro's DOPS and served as a model for similar organizations in other states.

The division had a specialized police force, distinguishing it from other auxiliary and neighborhood bureaus. Three of its sections — Social Order and Public Security, Political Security, and Supervision of Explosives, Weapons, and Ammunition — carried out political police functions, although political surveillance was not its sole mission. While monitoring political groups was not new to the police, its institutionalization was relatively recent. The bureau's primary activity was intelligence gathering through infiltrated agents, informants, wiretaps, and surveillance of suspects in public spaces, workplaces, and homes. This resulted in a large volume of reports and statistics, systematically shared with other state agencies. Its agents also conducted arrests, and its facilities held detainees before their transfer to prisons, from where they could be exiled from the capital.

The immediate reason for its creation was the rise of the tenentist movement, which necessitated an entity to protect the First Brazilian Republic's government from a series of military conspiracies. Thanks to the political police, many conspiracies were dismantled before escalating into revolts. Similar police reorganizations were occurring in other countries in response to the revolutions of 1917–1923. The 4th Bureau's agents targeted military personnel, members of the political elite, anarchists, communists, and common criminals. During most of the long state of emergency under president Artur Bernardes (1922–1926), its head was major Carlos Reis, under whom the prisons became overcrowded, and the police were accused of torture and even killing detainees, notably in the Conrado Niemeyer case. Before and during the Constitutionalist Revolution of 1932, the 4th Bureau persecuted conspirators and propagandists opposed to Getúlio Vargas' government.

== Creation ==
President Artur Bernardes signed a decree reorganizing the Civil Police of the Federal District on 20 November 1922, five days after taking office. Among other measures, the decree abolished the requirement that the Chief of Police could only be a law graduate, subordinated the Identification and Statistics Offices, Legal Medical Services, and Investigations and Captures divisions to the Ministry of Justice and Interior Affairs, proposed the creation of a Civil Police Academy, and transformed the Inspectorate of Investigation and Public Security into the 4th Auxiliary Police Bureau.

The Inspectorate of Investigation and Public Security, established in 1920 during the administration of Epitácio Pessoa, was the first police body officially created to preserve the political regime. Its primary section was Social Order and Public Security, which reported directly to the inspector, unlike other sections that were under three sub-inspectors. This section already existed within the predecessor organization to the Inspectorate, the Investigation and Public Security Corps. While providing intelligence on political opponents to the government is an old police function, it took time to be formally institutionalized in Brazil. The term "political police" first appeared in Brazilian legislation in 1900 as a responsibility of the Chief of Police, without the establishment of a dedicated organization for this purpose.

Initially small, with one commissioner and seven agents in 1917, the Social Order and Public Security Section continuously grew in importance. Anarcho-syndicalist agitation among workers was reaching its peak during the strikes of 1917–1919, and political police activities first developed to monitor this environment and later expanded to include elite opposition figures. Abroad, major European countries were organizing political police forces in response to the revolutions of 1917–1923. The reorganization of state security was an international trend, materialized in conferences and international police agreements. On 29 February 1920, two days after the regulations for the Inspectorate were published in the Official Gazette, Brazil signed a treaty with Argentina, Bolivia, Chile, Paraguay, Uruguay, and Peru under the auspices of the League of Nations for the exchange of information on "anarchic acts". Later, in 1926, the 4th Auxiliary Police Chief traveled to Switzerland, Germany, France, and other European countries on a mission from the Ministry of Justice, observing local police measures against communism.

The reorganization of the police responded to two demands: modernizing the institution and protecting those in power. It reflected a trend toward specialization, which led to the growth of the Central Police Sections at the expense of neighborhood bureaus. Politically, military revolts motivated the institutionalization of the political police. The first of these, the Copacabana Fort revolt on 5 July 1922, attempted to prevent Bernardes' inauguration. Although suppressed, it marked the beginning of a military movement against the regime, known as tenentism. While anarchists organized strikes and planted bombs, the tenentists wielded heavy weaponry. That same year also saw the emergence of another group opposing the regime, the Communist Party. The funding for the establishment of the bureau was included in the 1923 budget of the Ministry of Justice. According to the law, the 4th Bureau would receive the "necessary credit," unlike most government agencies, which faced fixed allocations due to the economic crisis.

The 4th Auxiliary Police Bureau served as a model for similar organizations in the states. In 1924, São Paulo established the Department of Political and Social Order, whose acronym — DOPS — would become emblematic of these institutions. In 1927, Minas Gerais created the Civil Police Investigations Service, which included the Department of Personal Security and Political and Social Order, with responsibilities very similar to those of the 4th Auxiliary Police Bureau. However, the federal government, which had created the 4th Bureau in the Federal District, did not play an active role in structuring state-level agencies.

== Organization ==
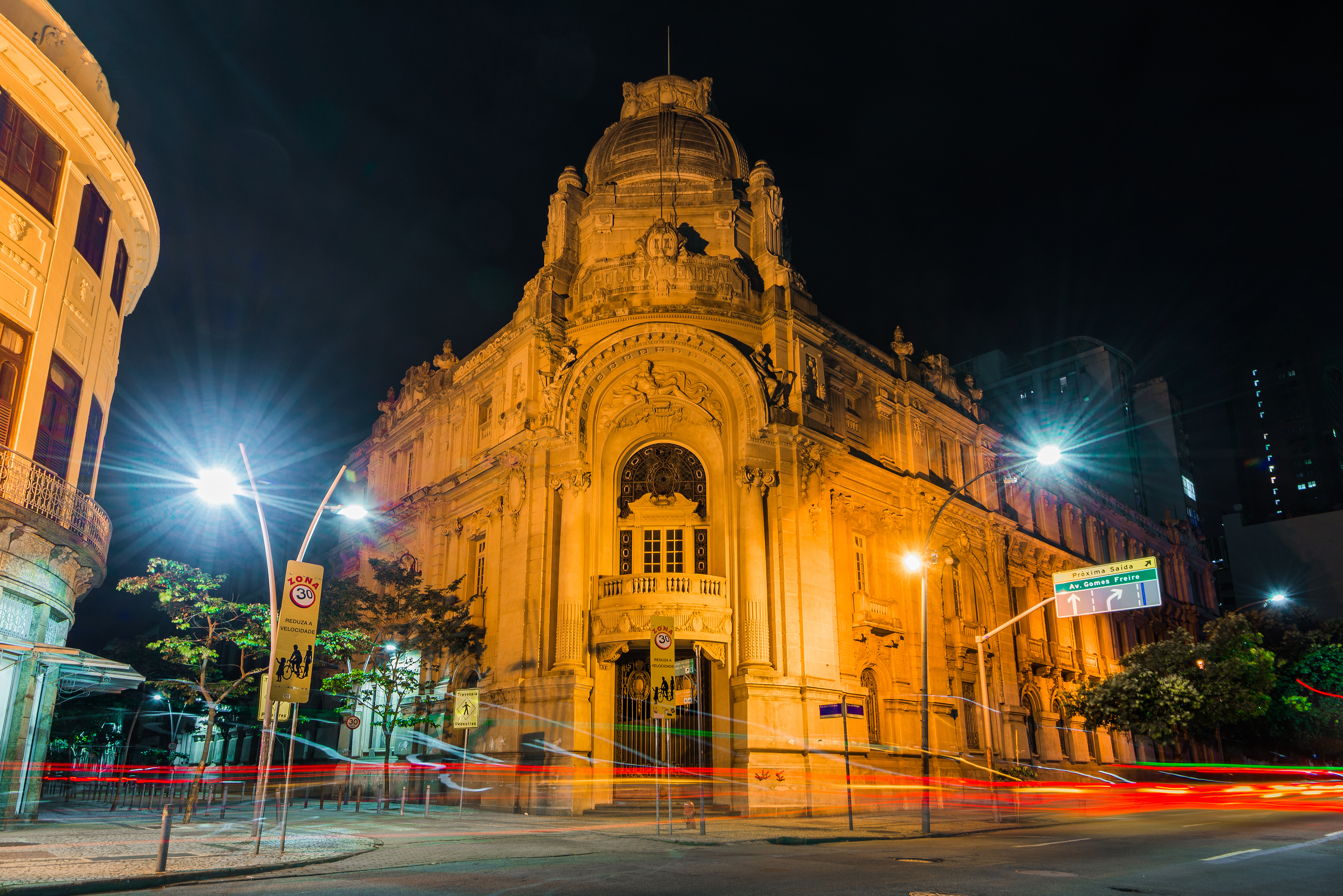
The Central Police Building in Rio de Janeiro

The 4th Auxiliary Police Bureau operated from the Central Police Building, which also housed the office of the Chief of Police, the highest authority in public security in the Federal District. Auxiliary police chiefs were appointed by the Chief of Police, who was, in turn, appointed by the President of Brazil. While the other three auxiliary police chiefs were required to be lawyers, the 4th police chief could be selected from officers of the Military Police. It was also crucial that the appointee was known for their loyalty to the government. Political guidance for the bureau came from the Military Cabinet of the Presidency of the Republic.

A specialized and distinct workforce developed within the Inspectorate of Investigation and Public Security and later in the 4th Auxiliary Police Bureau. Reports from police chiefs during 1923–1930 even mentioned the "excessive prominence" of the 4th bureau and its investigators. The intensity, significance, and complexity of its activities set it apart from the other three auxiliary bureaus. A 1932 report emphasized that it "has significantly more activity than the others due to the importance and complexity of the many services entrusted to it". While laws and decrees provide little insight into its internal dynamics, reports produced by the bureau itself are more revealing, as its organization developed through decisions made by the Chief of Police and the bureau's chief.

The 4th bureau inherited an eight-section structure from the Inspectorate of Investigation and Public Security: Administration, General Archive and Information, Social Order and Public Safety, Personal Security and Special Laws, Public and Private Property, Frauds and Forgeries, General Surveillance and Transportation, and Captures. A Supervision Section for Explosives, Weapons, and Ammunition appears in documents from 1925, and a Political Security Section in 1932, while the General Surveillance and Transportation and Captures sections disappeared by 1932. A notary office is also observable starting in 1925.

The decree establishing the 4th Auxiliary Police Bureau did not modify the responsibilities or level of autonomy of the now-defunct Inspectorate of Investigation and Public Security. Its novelty lay in the "routine of systematizing and exchanging information to guide the security agenda", with significant attention given to the production and storage of reports and statistics. The Archive Section exchanged information with national and international Identification Offices, while three sections (Social Order and Public Safety, Supervision of Explosives, Weapons, and Ammunition, and Political Security) maintained independent archives separate from the central archive.

Not all responsibilities were of a political nature. The sections specifically tasked with political policing were Social Order and Public Safety, Political Security, and Supervision of Explosives, Weapons, and Ammunition. Despite the existence of the Political Security Section, the Social Order Section also dealt with political matters. In this division of labor, monitoring the "labor movement, working classes, and their associations" was considered a social, not political, issue. The Social Order and Public Safety Section aimed to "safeguard the political existence and internal security of the Republic, employ preventative measures to maintain order, ensure the free exercise of individual rights, maintain maximum vigilance against anarchist expressions or forms, and promptly act on the expulsion of dangerous foreigners".

A decade after its creation, the development of political policing was already evident, but its agents had yet to be separated from routine police work. This only occurred in 1933, when the 4th Auxiliary Police Bureau was replaced by the Special Department of Political and Social Security (DESPS), which focused exclusively on political policing. The evolution of political policing continued, spurred by the centralization of power under Getúlio Vargas and the response to political-ideological uprisings against his administration. The DESPS eventually evolved into a series of other agencies, and after Brazil's capital was moved to Brasília, it became the DOPS of the state of Guanabara.

== Actions ==
The subordination to the Minister of Justice and the President of Brazil made the 4th Bureau a federal agency, but its jurisdiction was effectively the Federal District. Brazil's federalist political system allowed other states to develop their own departments, as a national political police would pose a threat to the states. Even so, the investigators of the 4th Bureau acted in any state and even abroad. In the 1920s, the bureau began cooperating with institutions outside the capital, especially in São Paulo, and in the following decade, it established "Identification Offices" within other police agencies to exchange information.

The rise of the political police disrupted the daily routine and created some competition with officers from neighborhood bureaus. Neighbors denounced one another for speaking ill of the authorities or for common disputes dressed up as political conflicts. New types of prisoners and authorities appeared in the bureaus. Political issues, except during moments of heightened tension, were not recorded in the logbooks.

The bureau's first chief was major Carlos da Silva Reis, nicknamed "Major Metralha" and considered a "cold-blooded and politically skilled individual", engaged in the repression of the tenentist movement and anarchism. He reported to the Chief of Police Carneiro da Fontoura. His tenure coincided with the prolonged state of emergency, which granted broad powers to the Chief of Police. The fear of conspiracies was so great that on 17 September 1925, Carlos Reis himself was summoned to testify about a trip he had made to São Paulo in the company of army major Thiago Barroso. Four days later, he was replaced by Francisco Chagas.

In April 1926, the tenentist threat subsided, and the Chief of Police and the 4th Auxiliary Police Chief were replaced. The new chief was lieutenant colonel Bandeira de Melo, who criticized the previous administration: "The political police among us caused an almost complete paralysis of true investigative work and had the effect of relaxing discipline". He distinguished between political and criminal investigations, arguing that the former was inadequate and ineffective because police officers lacked the connections to infiltrate conspiracies against the government. Within six months, 33 agents were dismissed for disciplinary reasons, and the chief announced that 44% of criminal cases had been solved. During the Washington Luís administration (1926–1930), the state of emergency came to an end, and hundreds of prisoners were released. However, political work continued, now focusing on communists.

In 1923, the bureau compiled the criminal records of 16,000 individuals suspected of political crimes. Statistics regarding the Section of Political and Social Order appeared for the first time in the annual reports of the Chief of Police in 1927 and 1928. During this period, the police opened files on 2,249 political and social matters, 1,231 recreational societies, and 144 professional associations. They conducted 1,750 arrests (of which only 92 occurred in 1928), monitored 125 "failed strikes", 195 conferences, and 160 meetings, and carried out 461 covert surveillance actions. In 1927, they cataloged 220 locations selling explosives, weapons, and ammunition. Throughout 1932, the bureau conducted 555 covert observation services (stakeouts), 535 investigations, 215 security operations, 84 investigations, 113 search and seizure actions, 348 patrols, and 413 summonses. According to the report, this workload overwhelmed the bureau's limited staff.

=== Investigation ===
In the documents produced by the 4th Bureau, its primary activity was identified as intelligence gathering. Through espionage, denunciations, and police investigations, the State mapped and even anticipated political, military, and labor movements. One of its routine activities was surveillance, or the monitoring of individuals, whose movements could be tracked in the streets, stores, workplaces, and homes. Information such as the duration of conversations, phone numbers of calls made, license plate numbers, and the presence of suitcases and briefcases were collected, allowing the identification of the networks of the individuals under surveillance. Another tool was wiretapping. In unions and workers' associations, the 4th Bureau infiltrated agents and recruited informants.

One example of a monitored individual was former president Nilo Peçanha, leader of the Republican Reaction and Bernardes' rival in the 1922 presidential election.

From 5 to 6 March 1924

[...] Mr. Nilo Peçanha, residing at Almirante Tamandaré Street, No. 20, was visited in the morning by general José Ribeiro Pereira and a gentleman who was a passenger in taxi No. 6561. At 19:00, he received a visit from Mr. Mauricio de Medeiros, and at 20:10, he was visited by two gentlemen unknown to the investigator. [...]

From 6 to 7 March 1924

[...] Mr. Nilo Peçanha, residing at Almirante Tamandaré Street, No. 20, was visited at 09:00 by general José Ribeiro Pereira and two gentlemen unknown to the investigator. The general left at 09:40. In the afternoon, he received visits from Mr. Arthur Costa, Mr. Modesto Leal, Mr. João Lourenço, and two other individuals. At 19:00, he was visited by Mr. Manoel Reis and, once again, by Mr. Arthur Costa. [...]

Even marshal Fontoura had his house monitored after being removed from his position as Chief of Police. Military personnel were a particularly challenging group to surveil, and several of them were recruited as informants. Carneiro da Fontoura incorporated a group of sergeants into the bureau who operated clandestinely, posing as civilian agents. These "secret agents" monitored officers sympathetic to the tenentist movement, who were sabotaging efforts to combat the Prestes Column.

The usual meeting points of those under surveillance were often in downtown Rio de Janeiro, such as on "Avenida" (now Rio Branco Avenue), Assembleia Street, Gonçalves Dias Street, Ouvidor Street, Largo de São Francisco, Largo da Carioca, Uruguaiana Street, Confeitaria Colombo, Café Papagaio, Passeio Público, and the home of Nilo Peçanha. Surveillance against the tenentist movement was conducted near army units, such as Pedro Ivo Avenue, República Square, and Praia Vermelha. An automobile patrol operated around the Central do Brasil Railway, which military personnel used daily to commute between their homes and workplaces.
