= Conrado Niemeyer case =

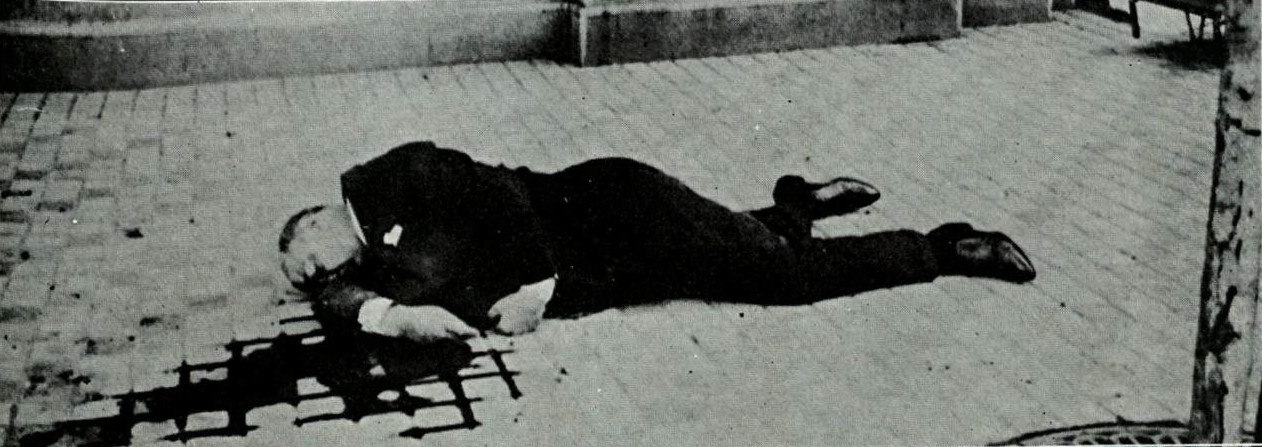
- Conrado Niemeyer's body lay stretched out on the sidewalk at Relação St.
- Location: 22°54′39″S 43°11′06″W; Rio de Janeiro, Federal District, Brazil
- Date: 24 July 1925; 101 years ago
- Deaths: Conrado Niemeyer

The Conrado Niemeyer case refers to the death of a Brazilian businessman detained on 24 July 1925 by the 4th Auxiliary Police Bureau of the Federal District. Conrado Borlido Maia de Niemeyer, born in Rio de Janeiro on 5 April 1871, came from a family of engineers, industrialists, and military officers and owned Casa Borlido Maia e Cia. The police accused him of supplying dynamite to tenentist conspirators operating clandestinely in the capital. On 24 July, Niemeyer accepted the summons from the chief officer Francisco Chagas, of the 4th Police Bureau, to testify at the Central Police Building.

The Federal District was under a state of emergency, and the government of Artur Bernardes, fearful of the tenentist conspiracies, used the 4th Police Bureau as a political police force. Two witnesses in the case, the industrialist Viriato da Cunha Bastos Schomacker and fireworks manufacturer Narciso Ramalheda, were also at the 4th Bureau on charges of collaborating with the conspirators. The police identified Niemeyer as the owner of a house on Flack Street where, days earlier, three investigators had been wounded in a shootout with tenentist officers.

Niemeyer died after falling from a window of the Central Police Station; according to the official version released to the press and confirmed by an initial police investigation, it was a suicide. At the request of his widow, a new investigation was opened by the Attorney General of the Federal District on 16 March 1927, after the state of emergency had ended. New testimonies provided evidence that Niemeyer had engaged in a physical struggle with the police officers, who violently beat him and threw him from the building. The Chief of Police at the time of the event, Marshal Carneiro da Fontoura, denied responsibility. Four police officers were indicted by the investigation: Francisco Chagas, Pedro Mandovani, Alfredo Moreira Machado, and Manuel da Costa Lima (the "26"). The testimonies had enormous repercussions.

On 5 April 1930, Dr. Oliveira Figueiredo, judge of the 1st Criminal Court, delivered the sentence of acquittal of the defendants. Historians such as Domingos Meirelles, Isabel Lopez Aragão and the Historical Atlas of Brazil, from CPDOC, reject the suicide version and consider that Niemeyer was thrown from the building. The same building, where the DOPS later operated, was the scene of other alleged suicides of political opponents, such as the American Communist Victor Allen Barron after the 1935 Communist Uprising and the trade unionist José de Souza after the 1964 coup d'état.

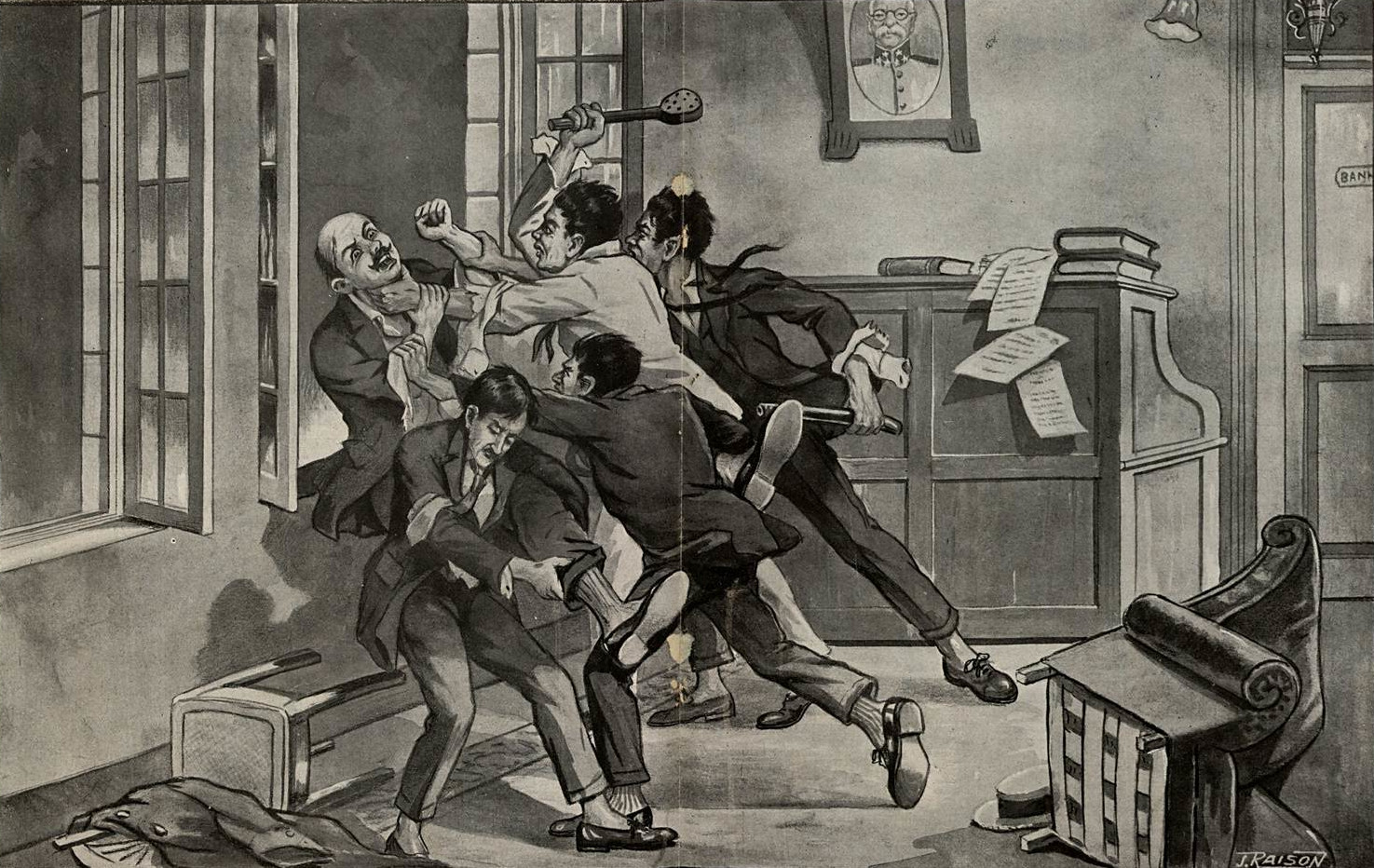
Drawing by J. Raison depicting the assassination of Conrado Niemeyer

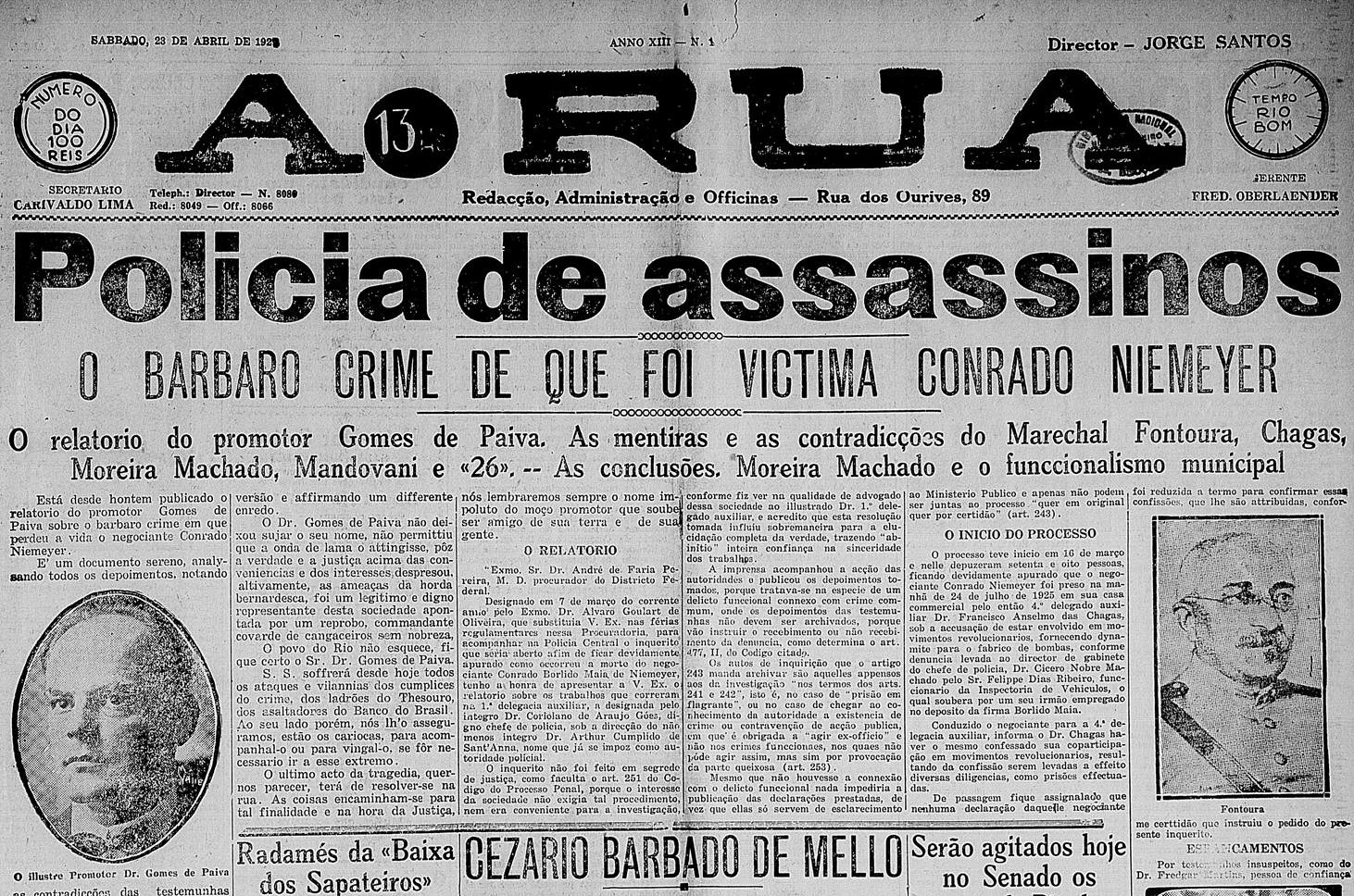
Front page of the newspaper A Rua accusing the police of killing Niemeyer
