= State of emergency in Brazil (1922–1927) =

The state of emergency's coverage area, with the date of first decree in each state

A state of emergency was in force in Brazil for much of the period from 1922 to 1927, comprising the end of president Epitácio Pessoa's government (1919–1922), most of Artur Bernardes' government (1922–1926), and the beginning of Washington Luís' government (1926–1930). The measure was decreed after the Copacabana Fort revolt, on 5 July 1922, and remained in force in several regions of Brazil's territory until the end of the subsequent tenentist revolts in February 1927, with the exception of the first months of 1924. At its peak in 1925, it was in force in the Federal District and ten states. The state of emergency allowed the political elite of the First Brazilian Republic to defend itself with authoritarian measures at a time of crisis, but the apparent tranquility after its suspension came to an end with the Revolution of 1930.

The first decree covered the Federal District and the state of Rio de Janeiro and was extended until the end of 1923, serving the post-revolt arrests of military personnel, journalists, politicians and trade unionists (even without links to the movement) and federal intervention against opposition politicians allied with Nilo Peçanha, Bernardes' competitor in the 1922 presidential election. In March 1924, the state of emergency in Bahia ended another opposition center. In July the measure was resumed in the Federal District, Rio de Janeiro and São Paulo, being extended and expanded to other states as the tenentists tried to overthrow the regime at gunpoint. The government feared that the revolts would turn into a revolution with anarchist or communist involvement and authorized extreme measures such as the bombing of São Paulo.

The Bernardes' administration insisted that law-abiding citizens would not be harmed and the violence of dissidents left no alternative but repressive measures. In the capital, they were led by the military authorities and by marshal Carneiro da Fontoura, Chief of Police of the Federal District, who had command over a political police body, the 4th Auxiliary Police Bureau. The state of São Paulo created its equivalent, the DOPS, in 1924; historian Carlo Romani sees continuity in this bureaucracy until the Estado Novo and the military dictatorship. Surveillance and whistleblowing were enough to prevent the São Paulo Revolt of 1924 from starting in Rio de Janeiro, but numerous other conspiracies were devised there and the government distrusted the Armed Forces. The police spied on suspects, hunted rebels underground and seized weapons and bombs while Brazil's Ministry of Foreign Affairs monitored rebel communities in exile.

Mass arrests without investigation or trial filled prisons, prison ships and islands in Guanabara Bay. For tenentism, this solidified a nucleus of professional rebels, while anarchism experienced the beginning of its decline amid the closure of unions and the arrest of militants. Political prisoners shared prison cells with common criminals and individuals with no criminal records or political activity. Federal deputies and witnesses reported unsanitary conditions and torture in these establishments. In the most remote of them, the penal colony of Clevelândia, hundreds of prisoners died from diseases, which would only become known to the public after the end of the Bernardes government, as the press was under censorship. In retrospect, Bernardes later stated: "as president of the Republic, I was just a police chief. And as a police chief faced with revolutionary pressure, I only knew how to do one thing: to arrest, persecute, contain by terror".

== Background ==
=== The state of emergency in the First Brazilian Republic ===
According to Brazil's 1891 Constitution, which was in force in the First Brazilian Republic (1889–1930), a state of emergency could be declared by the National Congress "in the event of aggression by foreign forces or internal commotion". In the absence of Congress, the President of Brazil could make the declaration in cases of "foreign aggression or serious internal commotion", but would have to report to Congress, which could approve or suspend the declaration. Therefore, the authority of the Executive was less than that of the Legislature in the matter. In practice, the initiative almost always came from the Executive.

The state of emergency declared by Congress suspended constitutional guarantees at a specific time and place, and that declared by the president was limited to "measures of repression against people", that is, "detention in a place not intended for those accused of common crimes" and "exile to other places in the national territory". Authorities would be responsible for any abuses committed. The constitutional text did not go deeper than this, but there was no ordinary law that regulated the measure. Thus, the suspension of constitutional guarantees was open to interpretations that were more or less restrictive of individual rights.

The predominant conservative interpretation in the Supreme Federal Court (STF) and in Congress from the turn of the century was of the state of emergency as an "intermediate between that of war and full peace", in the definition of president Campos Sales (1898–1902). According to Sales, the measure, "restricting individual freedom for a moment, with measures of an ephemeral nature, ensures and guarantees the permanent interests of the Nation". It would be a preventative measure and not merely a repressive one, and could be used by any government that felt threatened to be overthrown.

In the period from 1889 to 1930, the state of emergency was applied eleven times in Brazil, for a total of 2,365 days, according to a survey by the Federal Senate. In total, it was more than six years, or around 15% of the period. The measure was typically used in the capital. Brazil's first president, Deodoro da Fonseca, decreed a preventative state of emergency and closed Congress. His successor, Floriano Peixoto, used the measure to arrest and exile dozens of politicians (including members of the Chamber of Deputies and senators) and opposition journalists. After the Vaccine Revolt in 1904, the state of emergency led to the exile of hundreds of prisoners to northern Brazil. From 1910 onwards, the state of emergency and federal intervention became routine instruments of the government.

=== Dissenters in the 1920s ===
In its first decades the Brazilian Republic typically faced dissent in parts of the intelligentsia, the working class (among them anarchists and communists) and the Armed Forces. Their demands could include social reforms, compliance with the Constitution, an end to corruption and clientelism, and the moralization of public administration. Workers' demands focused on living and working conditions.

In the 1920s, dissenters were in open confrontation with the State, especially in the government of president Artur Bernardes (1922–1926). The climate was one of widespread popular dissatisfaction. Currency devaluation, a policy to compensate for the drop in coffee exports, had doubled inflation in 1921–1923. The writer Lima Barreto satirized the 1922 state of emergency in the crônica Estado de Sítio: two residents of a suburb of Rio de Janeiro agree "that all revolutions only serve to give prestige to governments" and one of them complains about not having been arrested, because if he were, he could postpone paying his debts and apologize to his creditors. From the author's point of view, daily worsening of living conditions was a more immediate concern for the poor than political violence.

==== The military and politicians ====
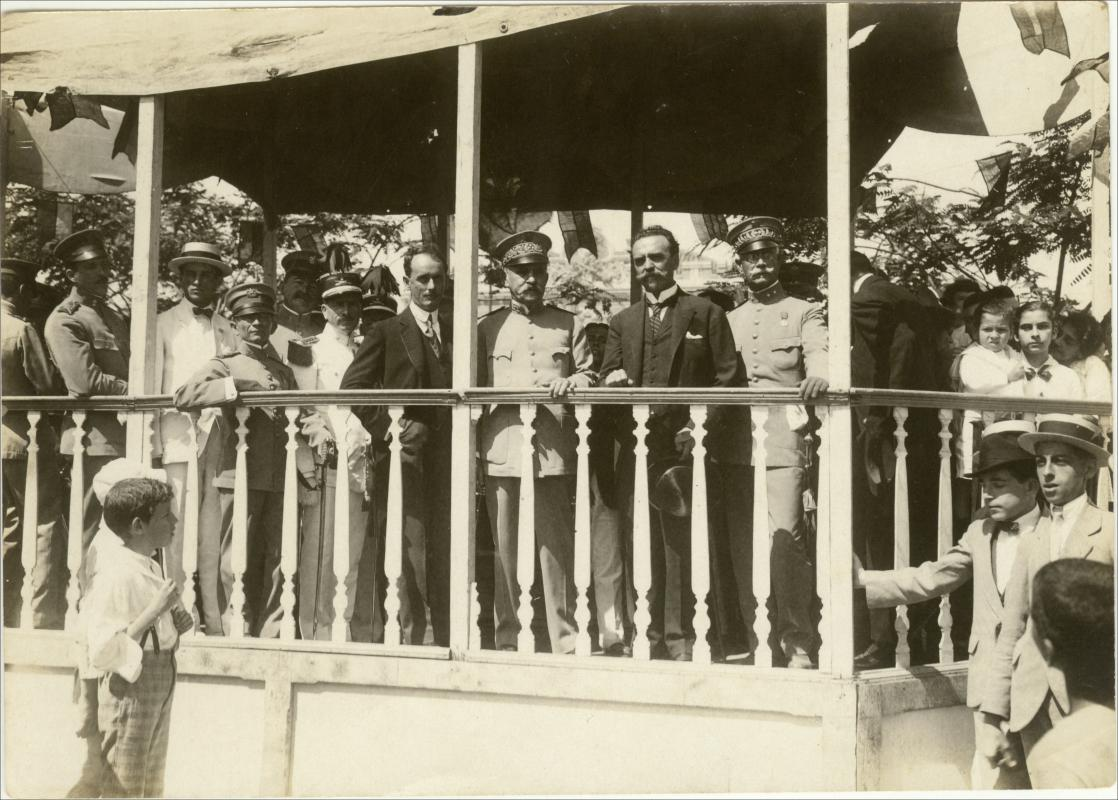
Nilo Peçanha (second from right to left) with military supporters in the 1921–1922 electoral campaign

Bernardes was elected in one of the few fierce elections of the period. His competitor's campaign, Nilo Peçanha's Republican Reaction, managed to take advantage of the urban classes, who felt excluded from the political system, although Peçanha's practices were not distinguished from other oligarchies in the countryside. Control of the electoral process by the status quo granted the victory to Bernardes, a representative of the dominant oligarchies of the Republican Party of Minas Gerais and the Republican Party of São Paulo. In his inauguration speech, Bernardes made it clear that he would not allow a change in the political regime from the outside in, and was intransigent throughout his term.

Several politicians from the Republican Reaction maintained contact with the tenentist conspirators in the Brazilian Army, believing that the military could still achieve its ideals. The Reaction was already disorganized when Bernardes took office, and the new president managed to establish his support base in the Legislative and Judiciary branches, expand the legal measures at his disposal and impose federal authority in the states of the Republican Reaction (Rio de Janeiro, Pernambuco, Rio Grande do Sul and Bahia).

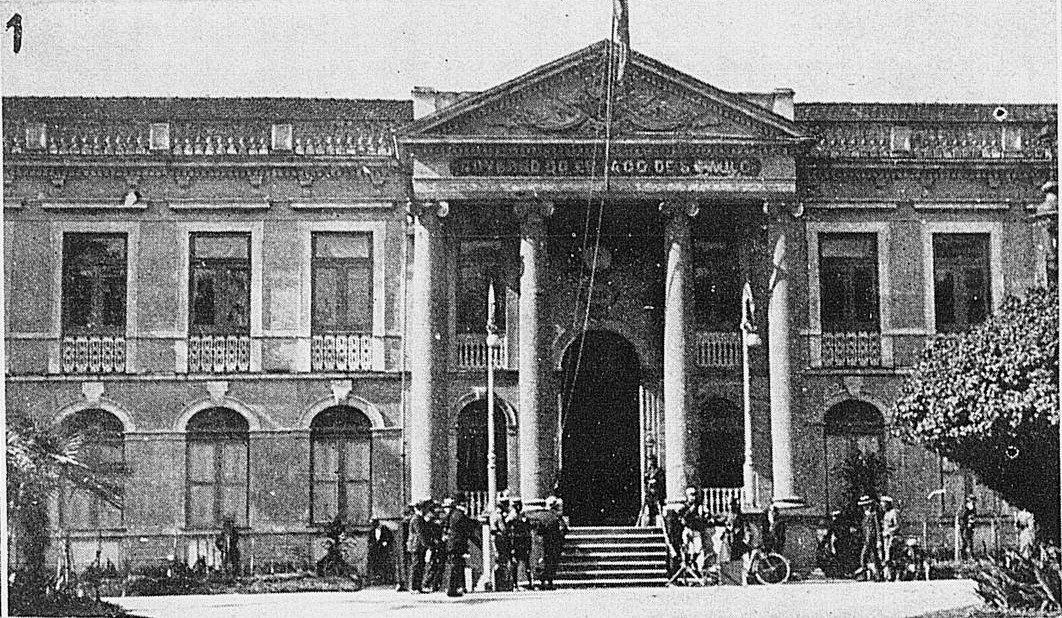
Government Palace of São Paulo under tenentist occupation in July 1924

The tenentists were the most active dissenters: they considered themselves a revolutionary movement to overthrow the regime, they wielded heavy weapons and had sympathies among the civilian elite. An influential line in historiography interpreted them as representatives of the urban middle classes against the political hegemony of the coffee oligarchies. They attempted to prevent the inauguration of Bernardes with the Copacabana Fort revolt, in July 1922, and started a wave of revolts across the country, starting in São Paulo, in July 1924, followed by the war of movement of the Prestes Column throughout the countryside until 1927. In addition to all the conspiracies that materialized as revolts, many others were unsuccessful. The number of deaths, the tenentists' defiance to the sovereignty of the Brazilian government and their claim to represent the entire nation are characteristics of civil war in this period.

==== Workers and anarchists ====
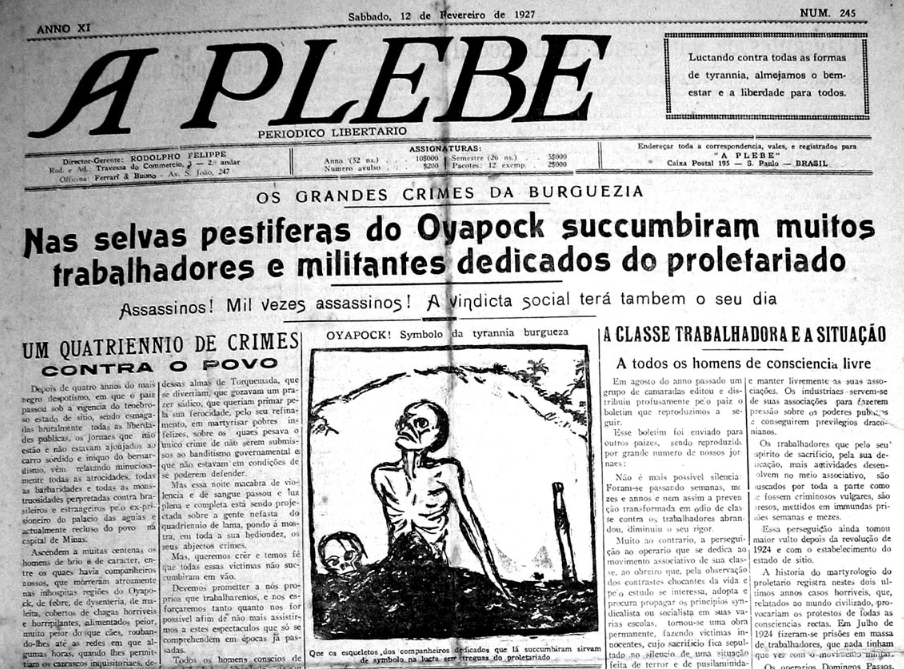
12 February 1927 issue of the anarchist newspaper A Plebe, denouncing "the great crimes of the bourgeoisie"

Meanwhile, the labor movement was going through an ideological crisis, a decline in strike activity, and state repression at the beginning of the decade. The policing of workers' organizations and the violent repression of strikes were already frequently reported by the labor and mainstream press throughout the First Republic, and the peak of strike activity had already passed in 1917–1919. The Bernardes administration was the most repressive towards the labor movement, but it also took some legal measures in favor of the workers, such as the Eloy Chaves Law, which created a pension system for railway workers, the founding of the National Labor Council and the vacation law for commerce and industry workers. These measures were, at least in part, intended to improve the country's image abroad.

The police classified the labor movement as a threat to the social order, more than to politics. However, there was an association between workers' doctrines and anarchism, and between strikes and insurrections. The anarchists were workers and intellectuals and had been the main faction in the workers' struggles at the beginning of the century, although they lost ground in the 1920s to the newly founded Communist Party. Aiming for the definitive abolition of the State, they destabilized the republican government. In 1918 some anarchists, union leaders and politicians even attempted an insurrection inspired by the Russian Revolution. The political system of the First Republic did not open up electoral opportunities for worker activists.

The strikes, demonstrations, newspapers and bomb attacks by organized workers could not match the tenentists' firepower. The government and police's recurring fear was that the military revolts would run out of control of the tenentists and become popular insurrections with anarchist or communist involvement. The war effort in São Paulo, a city with a history of labor conflicts, was alarming. Tenentist conspirators even sought the support of anarchist and communist leaders at times, the communists considered that tenentism could pave the way for the intended revolution and anarchists provided moral support to the revolt in São Paulo, even without direct participation. However, the tenentist leaders rejected any popular support that interfered with their political project, fearing that it would be subverted by workers participation.

From an anarchist point of view, the republican government, the tenentists and the communists were equal in their common ambition to control the State. Some anarchists even accused the communists of having had friendly relations with the Bernardes government. In response, the communists insisted that their comrades were also being persecuted and arrested. Repression of communists intensified later, in the 1930s. Some communist sources admitted that repression hit the anarchists harder, and Brazilianist John W. F. Dulles considered that lesser persecution in the state of emergency was what allowed the communists to become stronger than the anarchists in Rio de Janeiro. Historian Carlo Romani, who has an ideological affinity with anarchism, attributed the decline of anarchism in Brazilian unions to the Bernardes government.

=== Authoritarian tendency ===
Artur Bernardes, in the center, with his ministers in 1922

For historian Henry H. Keith, no other ruler of Brazil's First Republic, not even the centralizers and militarists (Deodoro da Fonseca and Floriano Peixoto), did as much as Artur Bernardes to strengthen the government against internal disorder. The "revolutionary threat" was used to justify urgent actions beyond the conventional legal procedures, the suppression of civil liberties and the practice of violence and arbitrariness. Later in his career, when he was a state deputy, Bernardes would have made a self-criticism about this period: "as president of the Republic, I was just a police chief. And as a police chief faced with revolutionary pressure, I only knew how to do one thing: to arrest, persecute, contain by terror". His government was marked by a serious social crisis, exception in the legal order, the reorganization of Brazilian law and relations between the State and the individuals.

The state of emergency was his tool to incorporate the image of a strong, centralizing ruler, who imposed top-down modernizations. This demonstrated the influence of authoritarian nationalist thinkers such as Oliveira Viana, Francisco Campos and Azevedo Amaral, who did not form their own political movement, but found favorable ground for their ideas in the interwar period, when democracy seemed demoralized and was contrasted with the example of Mussolini. Even the tenentist opposition was influenced by the same anti-liberal thinkers.

When requesting a review of the Constitution, Bernardes criticized the "enthusiastic and generous idealism" of past legislators, which had produced laws that were "excessively advanced and poorly suited to our country, our race, our nature, our social and political culture". He also criticized the restriction that the Constitution imposed on the death penalty in "civil or internal war", because "while the legal forces remain within the strictly legal orbit, without means that are often indispensable for their cohesion, the seditious ones employ all means, including summary shootings, to maintain their own discipline and instill terror in those who fight them and in defenseless populations". When criticizing the slowness of criminal proceedings, he stated that "the social order needs to be armed with more expeditious devices for repressing the guilty and acquitting the innocent".

== Government justifications ==
In his presidential messages to Congress, Bernardes succinctly addressed the state of emergency, which, according to him, was decreed "unwillingly, but in defense of high national interests", as he "having forgot that we live in a democracy, a regime of opinion, in which the will of the majority prevails, expressed at the polls, a factious and threatening minority intended to govern, imposing itself through terror and going so far as to conceive and proclaim the intention of seizing power no matter the cost". Against this minority, "the government has exercised a moderate preventative function, although it is willing to employ the most energic measures if necessary".

The state of emergency was treated as a normal instrument of public administration, which would only harm subversives. Law-abiding citizens and a clean press would have the guarantees of the normal regime, "in addition to the tranquility arising from the certainty that the Government can act quickly and safely against any disruptors of public peace". At the same time, the president (governor) of Paraná, Caetano Munhoz da Rocha, declared: "in Paraná no one suffers for being an opponent of the government or having disaffection with the President, or for being a proselyte of any religious belief. Everyone enjoys the same freedom, justice is done to everyone". On 15 November 1926, Jornal do Commercio argued that "the state of emergency has evolved to the point where it is not even felt by the people. Only the cursers and conspirators have noticed it. The orderly nation hardly believes that we are under it".

== Duration of the measure ==
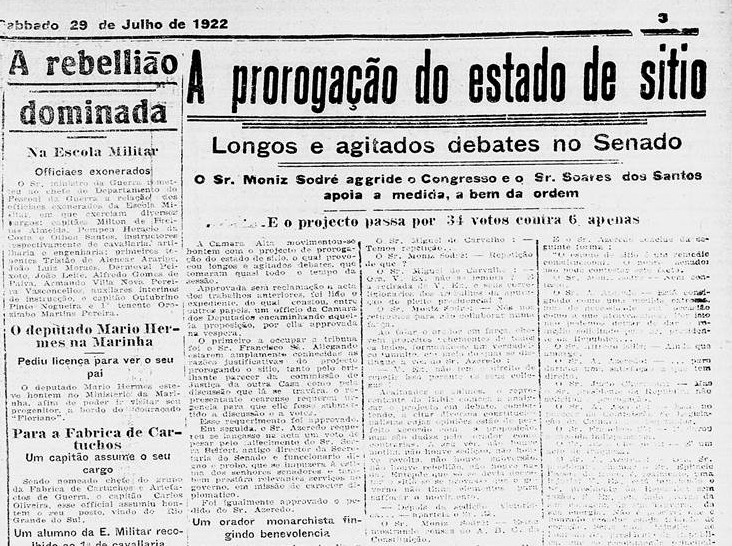
On 29 July 1922, "Long and agitated debates in the Senate" over the extension. "And the bill passes with just 34 votes against 6".

On 5 July 1922, when the shells fired by the first rebels at Fort Copacabana exploded near the Senate building, Congress approved the state of emergency with just one vote against it. The measure covered the Federal District and the state of Rio de Janeiro until 30 July, "with the President of the Republic being authorized to extend it for a longer period and to expand it to other regions of the national territory, if the circumstances so demand". With the revolt already suppressed, on 29 July the government of Epitácio Pessoa managed to preventively extend the measure until the end of the year. Thus, Artur Bernardes' inauguration, on 15 November 1922, took place under the state of emergency.

Of Bernardes' presidential term of 1,460 days, 1,287 were spent under a state of emergency somewhere in Brazil's territory, or 88.15% of the total, exceeding the sum of all his predecessors (991 days). There were several one- or two-day local suspensions for municipal, state, and federal elections. In its largest territorial extension in 1925, the state of emergency was in force in the Federal District and ten states. The exceptional measure became normality, being in force throughout the years 1923, 1925 and 1926. 1924 had only the first semester free from the measure. A deputy even spoke of a "chronic state of emergency", and the press dubbed Bernardes "President of the Emergency" and "Calamitous".

Congress continually approved extensions of the measure, despite some votes against it. The government's victories in the National Congress were overwhelming, as in 1924, when the Chamber of Deputies approved by 117 votes against 10 to extend the state of emergency; while the Senate approved it by 33 votes against 4. A small nucleus of opposition in Congress denounced the abuses committed under the cover of the state of emergency. In the Chamber of Deputies it included Azevedo Lima, Arthur Lemos, Leopoldino de Oliveira and Henrique Dodsworth. In the Senate, they were Soares dos Santos, Benjamin Barroso, Jerônimo Monteiro, Justo Chermont, Muniz Sodré, Lauro Sodré and Barbosa Lima. They attempted to suspend the state of emergency or prevent its extension, and in the Chamber they alleged that the government had carried out illegal economic operations, which contributed to the fiscal imbalance. The government had its defenders, such as deputies Antonio Carlos and Nicanor Nascimento and senator Bueno Brandão.

On 1 January 1923, Bernardes declared a state of emergency in the Federal District and the state of Rio de Janeiro for 120 days, until the end of the legislative recess, extending it on 23 April until the end of the year. During this period, the authorities were somewhat calm, even granting an extensive habeas corpus in January and February 1923. In the state of Rio de Janeiro, the emergency allowed the dismantling of the political machine of Nilo Peçanha, Bernardes' competitor in the 1922 election. On 23 December 1923, the day of inauguration of the status quo governor of Rio de Janeiro, Feliciano Sodré, the measure was suspended, in a scenario of apparent tranquility. On 19 March 1924, Bahia was placed under a state of emergency for 30 days, which was suspended on 5 April; it was a strong military presence to ensure the inauguration of governor Góis Calmon.

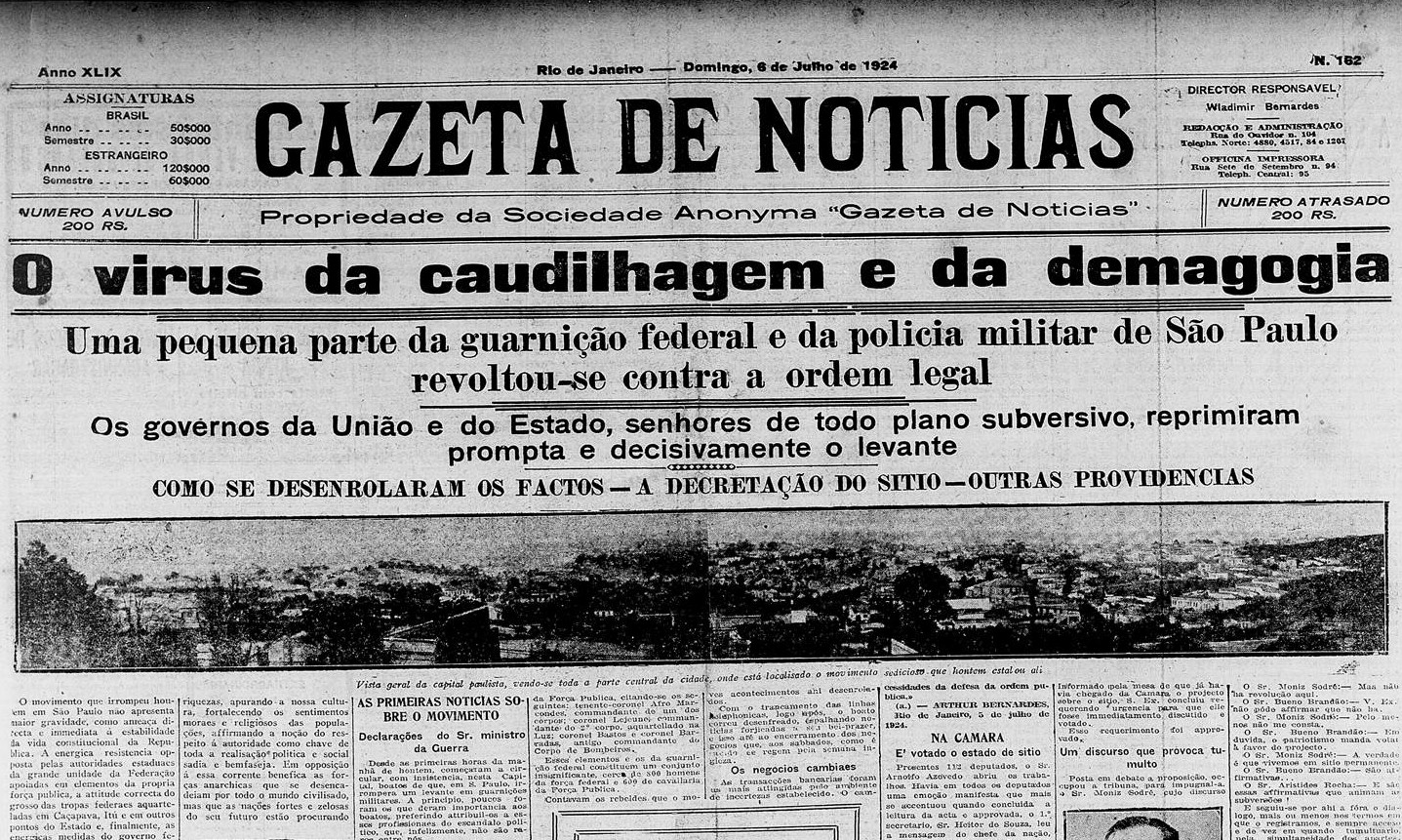
"The decreeing of the emergency" and "Other measures" against the revolt in São Paulo

On 5 July 1924, the new revolt in São Paulo immediately prompted Congress to approve the measure for the Federal District and the states of Rio de Janeiro and São Paulo for 60 days. Greater efficiency, number of defections and regions affected by the revolts aggravated repression. The state of emergency was extended to other states as new revolts broke out: Bahia and Sergipe on 14 July, (Note: See Tenentist revolts in Sergipe.) Amazonas and Pará on 27 July, and Mato Grosso on 26 August. (Note: See Tenentist revolts in Mato Grosso.) All were extended until the end of the year on 3 September 1924, which was then extended to Paraná on 17 September (Note: See Paraná Campaign.) and Rio Grande do Sul on 17 November 1924. (Note: See Rio Grande do Sul Revolt of 1924.)

Beginning in 1925, a state of emergency was decreed until 30 April for the Federal District and the states of São Paulo, Mato Grosso, Rio de Janeiro, Paraná, Santa Catarina, Rio Grande do Sul, Sergipe, Pará and Amazonas, plus Bahia on 21 February 1925. In all of them there was an extension, decreed on 22 April, until the end of the year. The state of emergency was lifted in Paraná and Santa Catarina on 14 October 1925, and in Bahia on 3 November. On the last day of the year it was extended until 30 April 1926 in the areas where it was still in force, minus Mato Grosso, but with Goiás, through which the Prestes Column was passing. A new extension to the end of the year came out on 23 April, with the addition of the state of Ceará, also because of Prestes Column. On 30 October 1926, the measure was extended to Mato Grosso and suspended in Ceará.

The presidential transition of power again took place under a state of emergency. Based on the movements of the Prestes Column in Mato Grosso and an ongoing revolt in Southern Brazil (the Lightning Column), the new president, Washington Luís, extended the state of emergency in Rio Grande do Sul, Santa Catarina, Mato Grosso and Goiás, initially by a month, and once again until 28 February 1927. The last active rebels in the country headed into exile. The state of emergency was lifted in Santa Catarina on 26 January 1927, and in Rio Grande do Sul on 7 February. Finally, Decree No. 17,683, of 10 February 1927, ended the state of emergency in the two remaining states "because the armed revolt that had ravaged Brazil since 1922 had been extinguished".

== Political police ==
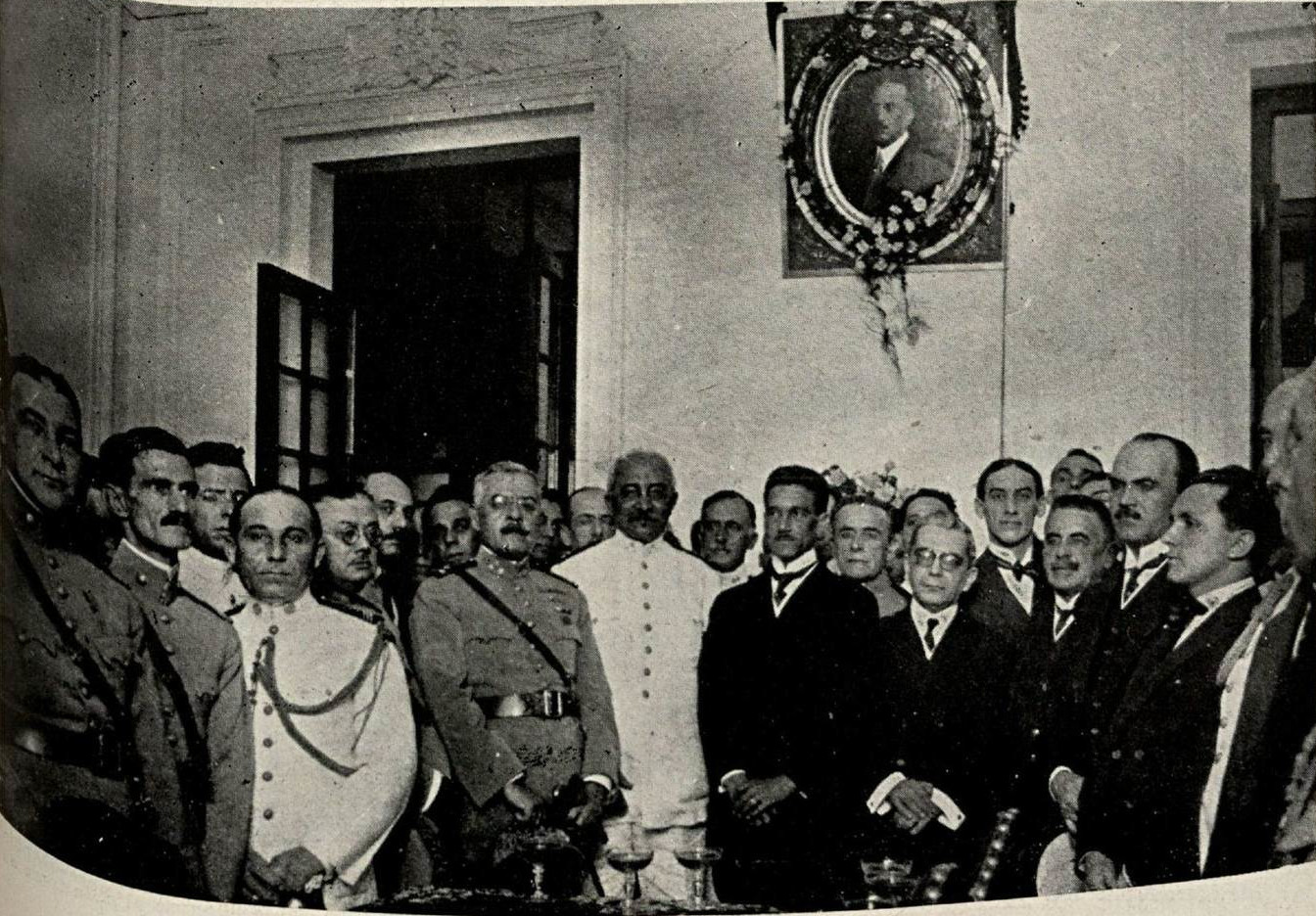
Marshal Carneiro da Fontoura, in the center, at the inauguration of Artur Bernardes' portrait at the Central Police Building

For historian Carlo Romani, the Bernardes government was unprecedented in organizing a bureaucracy of political surveillance and repression, whose mentality at lower levels remained until the Estado Novo and the later military dictatorship; "Both dictatorships did nothing more than expand the precursor seeds of the modern state of social control pioneered during the administration of president Artur Bernardes". Historian Isabel Aragão defined the system of this period as a "civilian dictatorship, legally supported by a state of emergency". In November 1922, shortly after taking office, Bernardes reformed the Federal District Police, transforming the Investigation and Public Security Inspectorate, whose responsibilities included political police and social order, into the 4th Auxiliary Police Bureau. This body was the first of many equivalents in the states, better known by the acronym "DOPS", created in 1924 with the São Paulo Political and Social Order Office.

The police reform allowed the office of Chief of Police, the highest public security authority in the capital, to be occupied by a military man instead of traditional law graduates. Bernardes appointed marshal Carneiro da Fontoura to the position, who had repressed the Copacabana Fort revolt when he commanded the 1st Military Region. Known as the feared "General Darkness" among his enemies, Fontoura would go down in history as the greatest persecutor of the rebellious military and, alongside the minister of war Setembrino de Carvalho, as one of the president's support pillars. The state of emergency strengthened him to the detriment of the Judiciary, allowing him to arrest suspects without trial.

The police structure in the Federal District was subordinate to the Ministry of Justice and Internal Affairs. It had bodies to process data on the population, the dead and injured, traffic, vessels and travel, and suspects and arrestees, as well as controlling public entertainment and providing a corps of censors. The 3rd Auxiliary Police Station controlled the boats' passenger lists, the main means of transport at the time, which proved to be effective in capturing rebels. As the rioters used false identities, the Police Chief sought to make them known to the agents and disseminate their photographs. Lieutenant Carlos Chevalier was almost arrested by the police upon disembarking in Rio de Janeiro, and Eduardo Gomes was recognized and arrested during a stopover in Florianópolis.

The 4th Auxiliary Police Bureau had three sections with political police content: Social Order and Public Security, Political Security and Inspection of Explosives, Weapons and Ammunition. It was initially commanded by major Carlos da Silva Reis, nicknamed "Major Metralha". The police station's main activity was the production of intel, through which the State monitored political, military and workers' movements. Information was collected through espionage in the streets, stores, work and homes, wiretapping, undercover agents and whistleblowers. Such activities sometimes occurred outside the capital and even outside Brazil. Daily reports reached the chief of police and the president; In addition to producing intelligence, the police station made arrests and sent prisoners to exile.

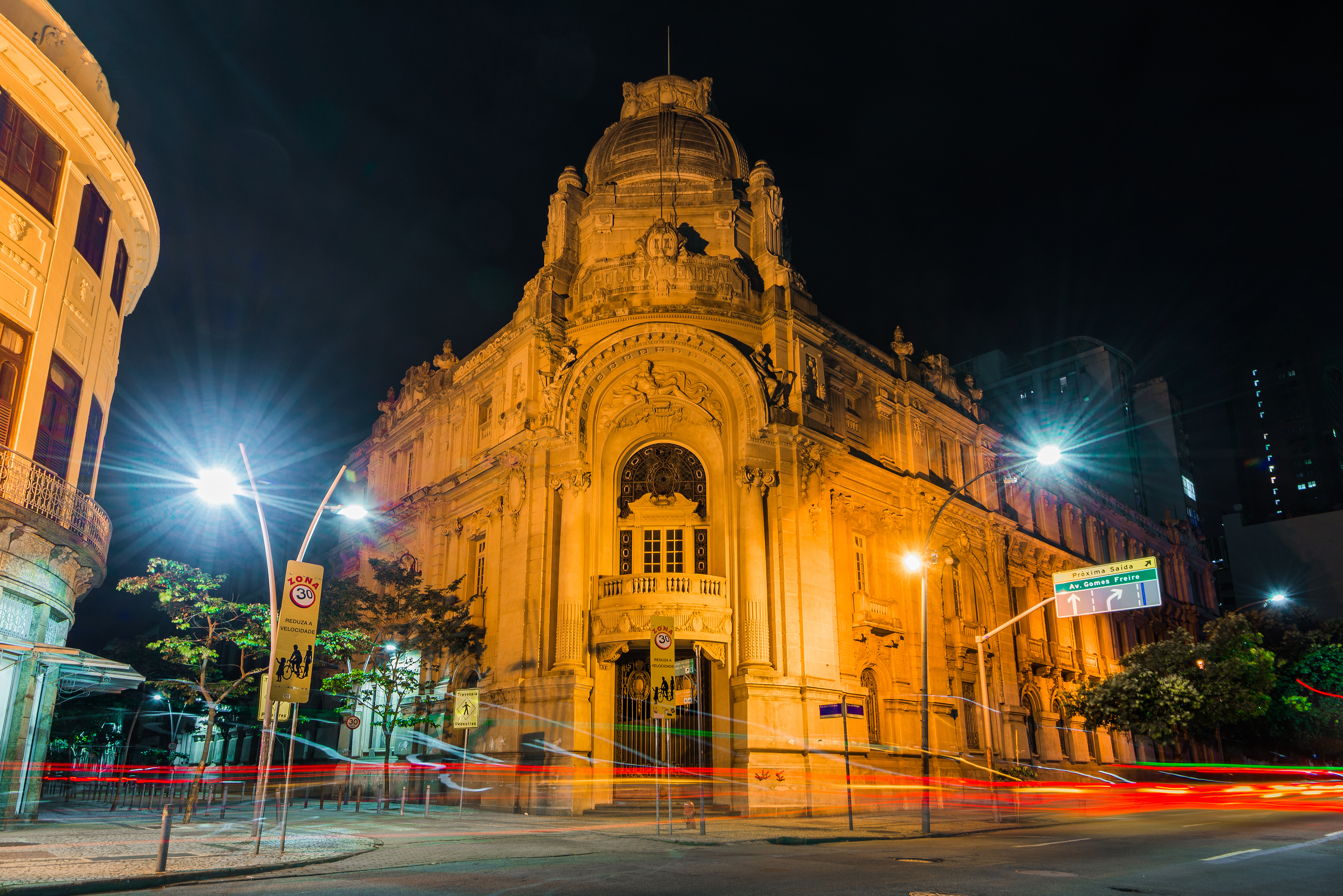
Façade of the Central Police Building in 2022

During the state of emergency, police raids and the closure of unions increased in number. Even though they were temporary, the closures disrupted a large part of the unions. In São Paulo, union activity was dismantled by the police in the second half of 1924. A report from the 4th Auxiliary Police Bureau, dated 25 June 1926, concluded that the situation of workers in Rio de Janeiro was "roughly satisfactory", but a handwritten comment on the document noted that "the workers are merely intimidated. They feel observed and fear police intervention".

The hunt for military deserters and fugitives forced them into a life of false identities, pilgrimages and escapes. The political police managed to dismantle numerous conspiracies; failed plans for military coups appeared in the political police files in November 1924, January 1925, March and June 1925. Armed clashes even occurred in Rio in November 1924 (the revolt in the battleship São Paulo, which the Brazilian Navy left without ammunition in advance, already suspecting the possibility of a revolt) and the attack on the barracks of the 3rd Infantry Regiment, in May 1925. The police also recorded seizures of weapons, bombs and dynamite, and the press reported frequent discoveries of bomb attacks, although O Globo would later accuse the 4th Auxiliary Police Bureau itself of faking the attacks. Some bombs even detonated. The explosion in general Tertuliano Potiguara's office on 21 October 1924 led to the amputation of his arm and was particularly damaging to the government's image.

Surveillance and denunciation in the capital were enough to dissuade the tenentist plotters from starting the July 1924 revolt there. On the other hand, in the same period the conspirators managed to visit barracks in São Paulo, Paraná, Mato Grosso and Rio Grande do Sul to recruit supporters, an activity that could not be completely hidden. The São Paulo government, in particular, behaved laxly, as it was excessively confident in its state strength. In military units dispersed over large distances in Rio Grande do Sul, loyalist control over the Post Office, which forced the conspirators to communicate in person, made it difficult to coordinate the revolt, but did not prevent its outbreak in October 1924.

According to deputy Henrique Dodsworth, "there is no falling fruit, no rustle of leaves, no brid flight in the gardens of the [Catete] Palace that is not immediately interpreted as harmful to the future of the Republic". Such was the fear of conspiracies that even the 4th police chief Carlos Reis was summoned to testify in September 1925 due to a trip to São Paulo in the company of one of his friends, an army major considered a suspect. Reis was removed from office days later. In April 1926, with the tenentist danger diminishing, Carneiro da Fontoura was replaced as Chief of Police by an experienced public prosecutor, Carlos da Silva Costa, who sought to calm public opinion. He appointed lieutenant colonel Bandeira de Melo, a Military Police officer and critic of what he called the excessive politicization of the department, to head the 4th Auxiliary Police Bureau.

== Federal intervention in the states ==
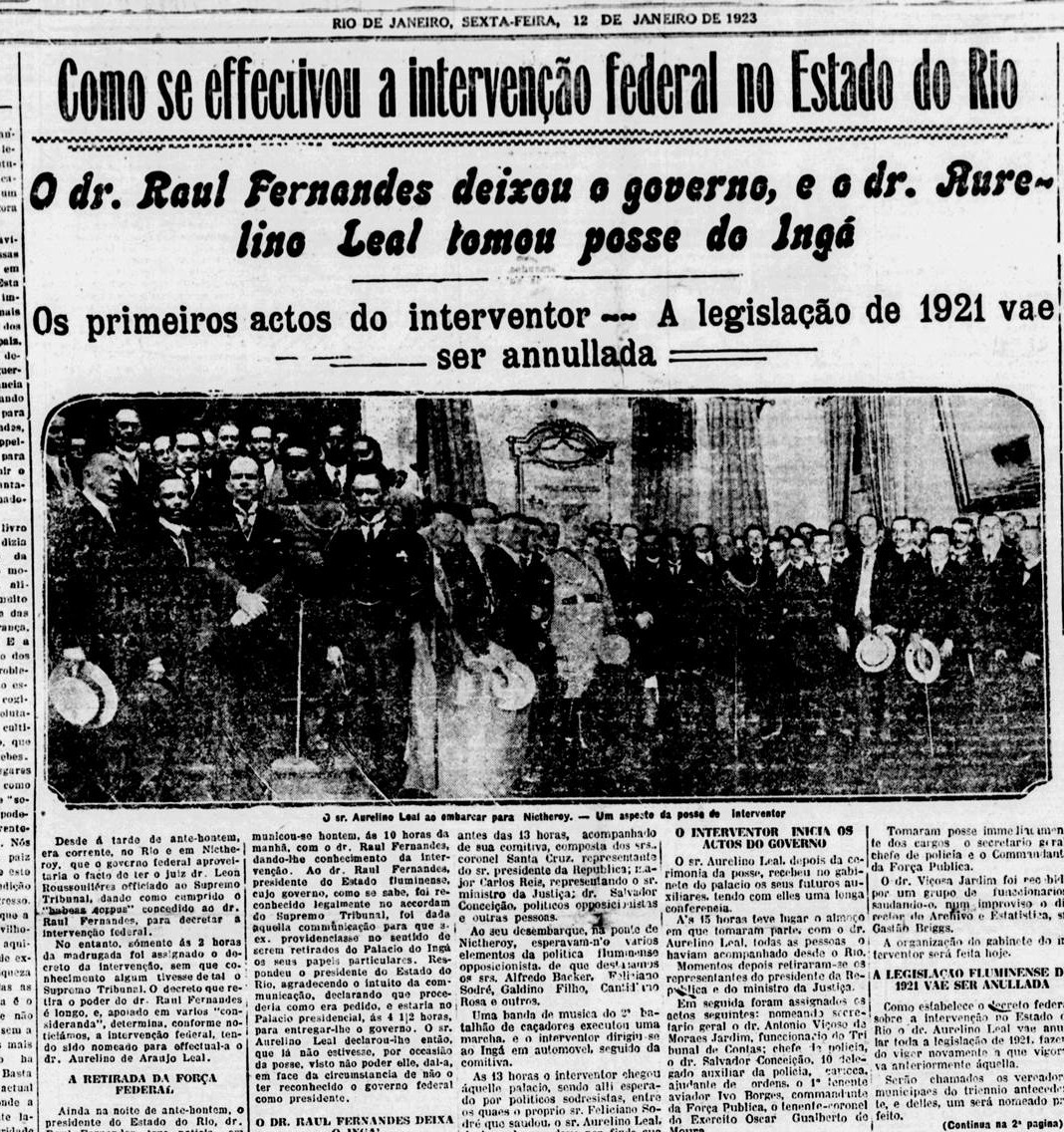
Federal intervenor Aurelino Leal takes office in the Rio de Janeiro government

The leaders of the three states that opposed Bernardes' presidential candidacy (Rio de Janeiro, Bahia and Rio Grande do Sul) found themselves vulnerable to federal intervention after his inauguration, and their respective oppositions had federal support. The federal government decided the outcome of political crises in the three states, the "state cases". In retrospect, historians considered that Bernardes' measures in Rio de Janeiro, Bahia and Rio Grande do Sul were vindictive. Even his defenders admitted that the president planned them in advance and in a "preventative" way.

On 9 July 1922, the state of emergency was suspended for one day in the state of Rio de Janeiro for the state elections. The election for President of the State (governor) was won by Raul Fernandes, an ally of Nilo Peçanha, whose supporters also controlled the Legislative Assembly and the municipal chambers. Nilo Peçanha's Republican Reaction had been supported by the 1922 rebels, and although the police investigation cleared him, the 4th Auxiliary Police Bureau monitored his home in the city of Rio de Janeiro, recording the visits of suspected conspirators.

The Rio de Janeiro opposition and the defeated candidate, Feliciano Sodré, had federal support. Raul Fernandes obtained a habeas corpus from the Supreme Court to ensure his inauguration, on 31 December 1922, but the opposition state deputies, who met separately in the Niterói City Council, did not accept his authority and proclaimed Sodré governor. The Nilist state government was obstructed in every aspect. Armed groups in the state's countryside occupied public buildings and removed municipal employees, which Sodré's followers attributed to their "respective populations", and Nilo's allies to agents of the army and the Federal District Police. The Supreme Court did not intervene. According to the Nilist account, the government of Raul Fernandes tried to send the State Police Force to prevent the depositions, but under the pretext of a state of emergency, the region's military commander prohibited the troops from embarking. The crisis had a lot of repercussions in the press, as the capital of Rio de Janeiro was close to the Federal District.

The two governments in the state's Executive and Legislative branches served as a pretext for federal intervention, which took place on 10 January 1923. Bernardes appointed Aurelino Leal, former police chief of the Federal District, as intervenor. Contrary to the consolidated interpretation of federal intervention, the intervention government completely replaced the normal government. The Supreme Court debated whether to issue a note of protest and chose not to comment. Congress debated the intervention decree until September. Despite being controversial, the intervention had broad support from jurists and politicians. New elections were called and Feliciano Sodré took office at the end of 1923.

The possibility of federal intervention also loomed in Bahia, but the instrument used by the federal government was the state of emergency. In Rio Grande do Sul, the opposition started a civil war, the Revolution of 1923, expecting a federal intervention, but it did not come, possibly due to the lack of dual state governments or the strength of the local Military Brigade, which would make direct military intervention difficult. The federal government brokered the Pact of Pedras Altas, which ended the conflict and prohibited the reelection of governor Borges de Medeiros. Borges made peace with Bernardes and the Military Brigade fought within the loyalist army in São Paulo.

== Press control ==
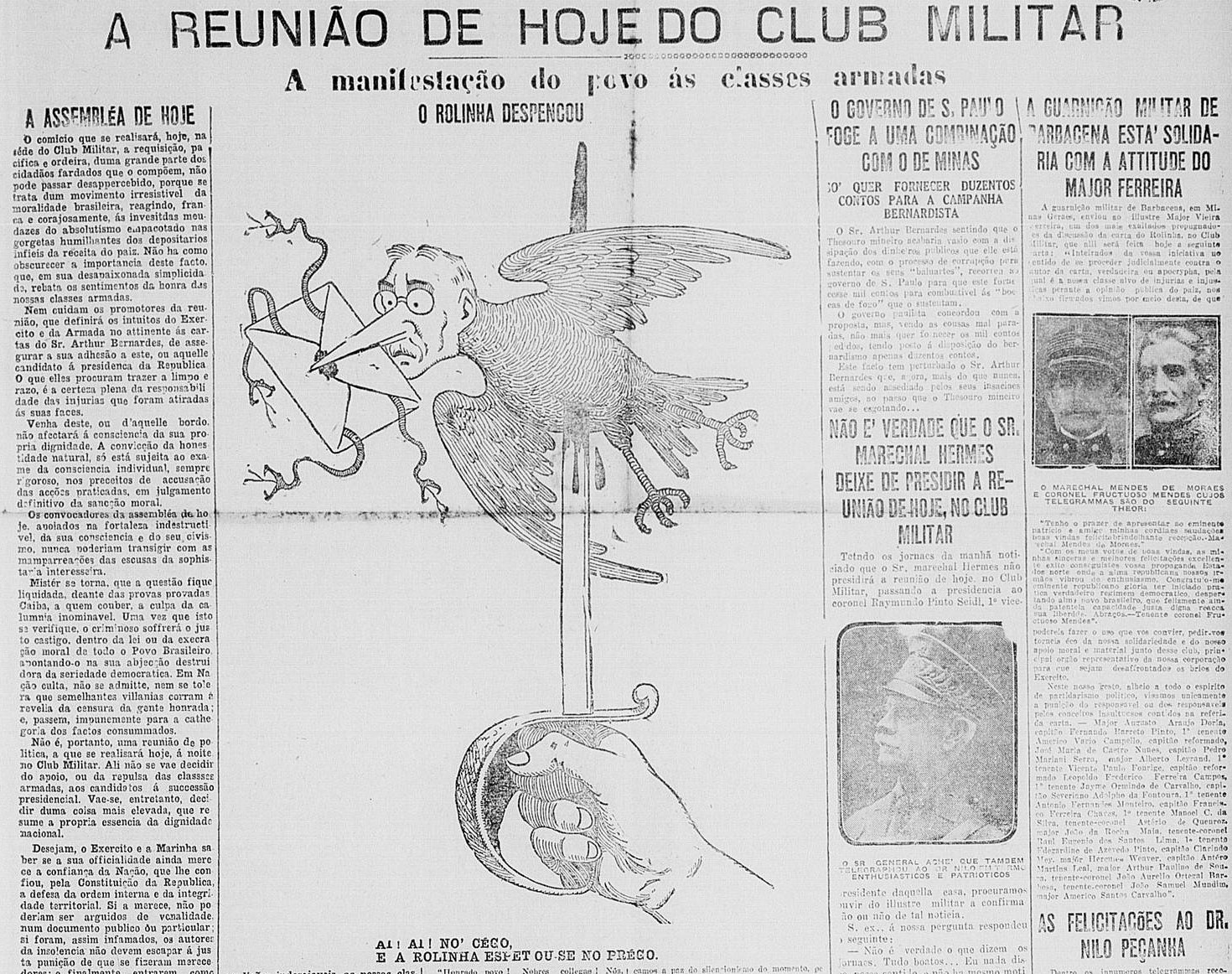
In the 1921-1922 electoral campaign, the weekly A Rua, which claimed that the letters attributed to Bernardes were real, depicted him as a columbina pierced by the military's sword

"Censorship of the press that incites anarchy and crime", in the words of president Bernardes, was one of the activities permitted by the state of emergency. Journals were subjected to criminal prosecution, and journalists were attacked and arrested. From July 1924, the federal government controlled the news in the country's main newspapers to suppress the repercussions of the rebellions. The information was released three to fifteen days after the events, and with a strong pro-government bias. News of the Paraná Campaign reached the press weeks late and the censors, after approval, did not allow any changes, not even to replace the word "yesterday". An approval from the legislative houses was necessary for parliamentary debates to be released to the press. After Washington Luís was defined as the status quo candidate for the 1926 presidential election, deputies denounced that newspapers were prohibited from criticizing him.

During this period, newspapers took sides in political disputes and openly discussed their ideas. The large press on an industrial scale, organized as a capitalist venture and with claims to permanence, supplanted the small and "artisanal" newspapers. In São Paulo, Correio Paulistano, an organ of the Republican Party of São Paulo, and O Estado de S. Paulo, apparently neutral in relation to the tenentists, competed. In Rio de Janeiro, five newspapers stood out with large headquarters on Central Avenue: Jornal do Brasil, Correio da Manhã, Gazeta de Notícias, O Paiz and Jornal do Commercio. O Paiz and Jornal do Commercio were pro-government. At the other extreme, Epitácio Pessoa called Edmundo Bittencourt, owner of Correio da Manhã, and Irineu Marinho, of A Noite, "abject exponents of the Nilist press". Correio's enmity dated back to the 1921–1922 electoral campaign, when it published fake letters, with insulting content the military, attributing them to Bernardes. The letters created popular antipathy towards the Bernardes and accentuated military discontent.

Journalists from seven newspapers (Correio da Manhã, A Noite, O Imparcial, A Vanguarda, O Rebate, A Rua and Jornal do Brasil) were arrested after the 1922 revolt, including Edmundo Bittencourt and Irineu Marinho. On the same day that the state of emergency decree was issued, there was already a police officer in each newsroom. In November 1923, three of the journalists remained in prison, including Bittencourt, despite the lack of proven links to the revolt. In the first days of July 1924, Bittencourt was arrested again, along with the director, deputy director, manager, editorial secretary and advertising agent of his newspaper. The interim director, Pinheiro da Cunha, was summoned to testify and received a sentence of arrest when he refused to publish a retraction note for what the newspaper had published about president Bernardes. On 31 August, the minister of justice ordered the newspaper to close as a public order measure. Maurício de Lacerda, a journalist for Correio, spent eight months in prison, had three requests for habeas corpus denied and was personally informed by major Carlos Reis that "he cannot be released. It is the president's order. And a severe order".

José Eduardo Macedo Soares, founder of the opposition newspapers Diário Carioca and O Imparcial, a cousin of the rebellious tenentist Edmundo de Macedo Soares and host of rebels on his farm in Maricá, was also arrested. Jornal do Brasil, Gazeta de Notícias, O Imparcial, A Rua, O Trabalho and O Jornal do Povo had their newsrooms invaded by the police. O Combate was suspended, and in its place O Povo was launched in March 1925, with the same editorial line. In São Paulo, O Estado circulation was suspended on 29 July 1924 and resumed on 17 August. In Rio Grande do Sul, censorship was applied after the 1924 and 1926 revolts.

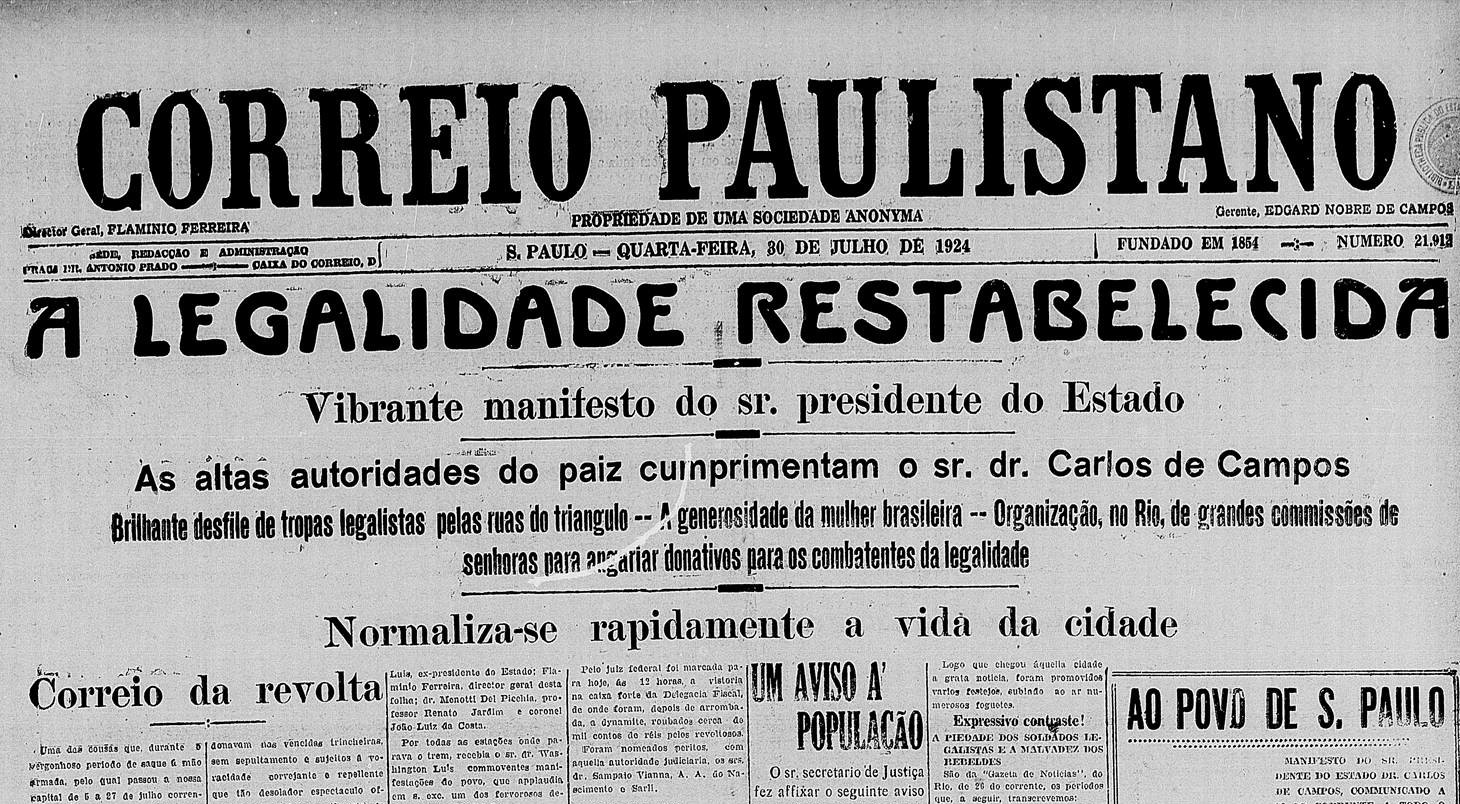
On 30 July 1924, Correio Paulistano celebrates the loyalist victory in São Paulo

The workers' press, their main instrument of propaganda and debate, was suppressed after July 1924; in the first decades of the Brazilian Republic, this press was the hardest hit when measures were taken against journalists. The anarchist newspaper A Plebe did not circulate during the state of emergency. The communist press fared better; its two main newspapers in São Paulo, O Internacional and O Solidario, were little affected. In 1925 the party managed to publish A Classe Operaria, printed at O Paiz's printing plant (where there was a communist cell), with the government's consent, which wanted to avoid labor disturbances at the newspaper. A Classe Operaria was published without censorship and was so successful that the government broke the arrangement and closed the newspaper in July.

Despite censorship, the rebels' legal status continually appeared in the newspapers. Every boarding, arrest, escape, shooting, prison interview, and death made news. Even the rebels in the remote Ilha Grande prison had access to newspapers and were able to publish interviews and manifestos and obtain information. For years the political police in Rio de Janeiro unsuccessfully hunted for the printing of the clandestine tenentist newspaper 5 de Julho, edited by the anarchist Antônio Canellas. The Prestes Column itself edited a newspaper, O Libertador, and the tenentists transmitted information to Brazilian public opinion through the Argentine press and the speeches of deputy Batista Luzardo.

== Consequences on foreign policy ==
The government's authoritarian policies and internal disorder had repercussions abroad, eroding Brazil's efforts to gain prestige through a permanent seat on the League of Nations Council. In 1924, diplomat Mello Franco commented to Félix Pacheco: "if by next September order has not yet been reestablished in the capital of the great State of the Union [São Paulo], I do not know how we will be able to plead in the Assembly and in the Council the question of our admission as a permanent member of the latter". The bombing of São Paulo in July 1924 provoked numerous protests by foreign citizens to consulates, many of which received no response. The prolonged state of emergency, added to the imbalance in public finances, created distrust with Brazil on the international stage. According to parliamentary documents, a foreign bank manager said: "Do you want the exchange rate to rise? Suspend the state of emergency!"

Loyalist military victories exiled waves of tenentists to neighboring countries. In exile, they reestablished their military and civil contacts and reorganized themselves for new struggles. In response, Brazilian consulates in Argentina, Uruguay, Paraguay and Bolivia, collaborating with intelligence agents from the Armed Forces, paid for information, violated telegraphic messages from domestic networks in Argentina and Uruguay, worked with customs to curb arms, ammunition and food smuggling and kept the Brazilian government informed of tenentist activities abroad. The fight against tenentism by Brazil's Ministry of Foreign Affairs began in 1924 and lasted until 1929.

== Military policy ==
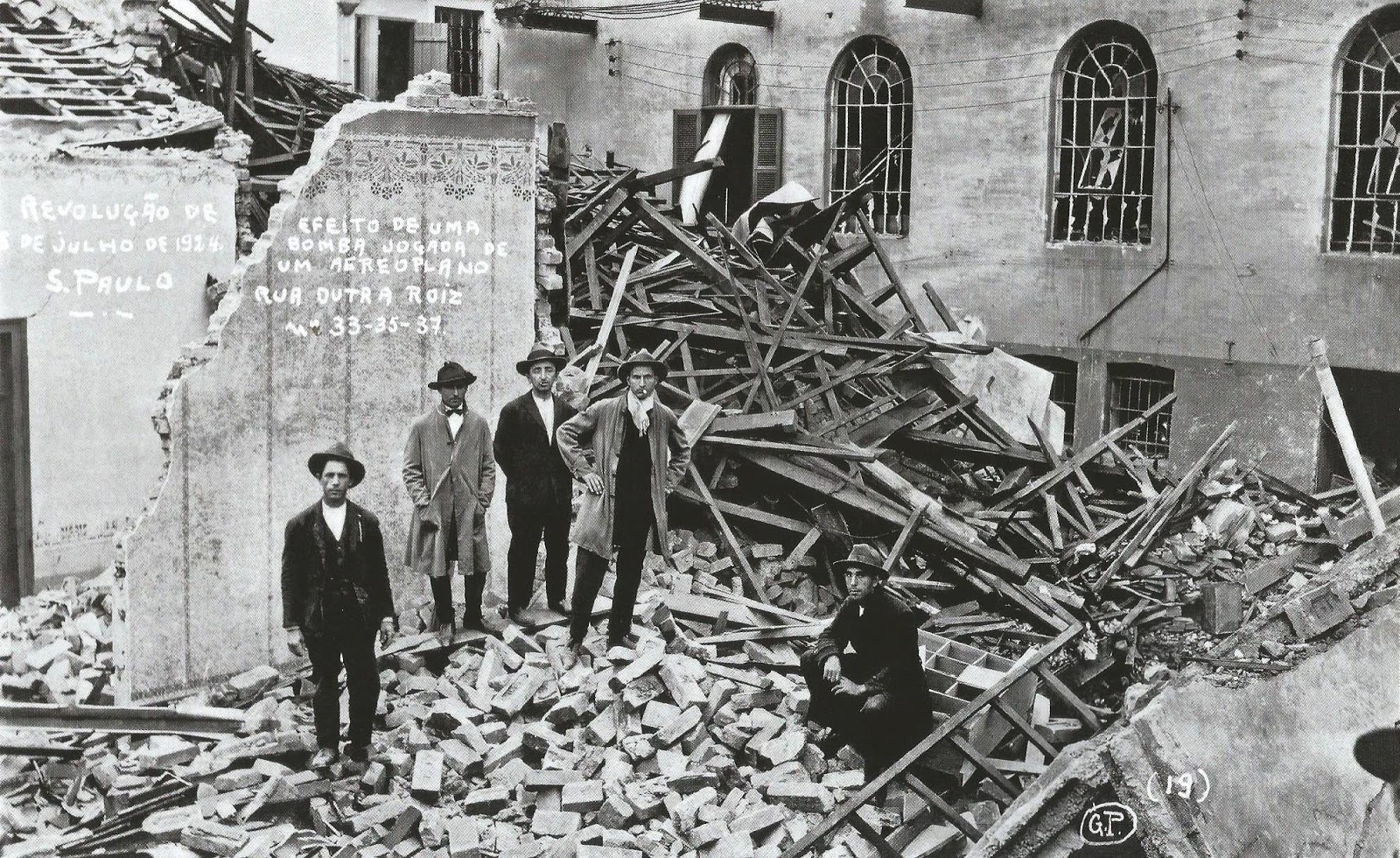
A house destroyed by a loyalist airstrike in São Paulo

As usual, Bernardes appointed military officers to the War and Navy ministries, abandoning his predecessor's experiment in handing these offices over to civilians. The person chosen for the Ministry of War was general Setembrino de Carvalho, who had fought the Copacabana Fort revolt in 1922 and was committed to the politics and society of the Old Republic. (Note: "Epitácio Pessoa decided not to appoint military personnel to the Ministries of the Navy and War. During his term, the navy had three civilian ministers: Raul Soares, Joaquim Ferreira Chaves, and João Pedro da Veiga Miranda; and the army had Pandiá Calógeras. After the government of Epitácio Pessoa, the military ministries were once again occupied by military personnel". Santos Júnior, Antônio Modesto dos (2019). As forças armadas no Estado Novo: tensões político-militares na criação do Ministério da Aeronáutica (1937-1942) (PDF) (Dissertation). Programa de Pós-Graduação em História da Universidade Salgado de Oliveira.. p. 163.) Unlike his predecessors, Bernardes did not grant amnesty to the military rebels. This change made sense, as past impunity subverted discipline, but intransigence was seen as oppressive by those affected and encouraged new revolts. The president was aware of the military conspiracies; months before the São Paulo revolt in 1924, confidential reports were already arriving at his desk. Suspicious officers were often detained or transferred to other commands. The transfers were counterproductive, as the transferred officers contaminated their new garrisons with discontent.

The president spared no resources in combating tenentism. To dislodge the tenentist rebels from the city of São Paulo, Bernardes authorized an indiscriminate artillery bombardment against the city, which destroyed areas full of civilians. To complement the Federal Army, the government turned to state Public Forces and patriotic battalions formed by local chiefs. Many federal officers, including among the forces sent to fight the Prestes Column, were sympathetic to the tenentist cause or did not have the courage to fight against their comrades. As recalled by general Eurico Gaspar Dutra, the majority's attitude was to "let it pass". The Prestes Column remained in an "armed protest demonstration" for years, withdrawing into exile intact, but without defeating the loyalist army or taking power in Rio de Janeiro, which was not its objective, according to Brazilianist Frank McCann.

The government's distrust of the Armed Forces was evident in the drop in defense spending, from 23.38% of the national budget in 1921 to 17.65% in 1927, which hampered modernization efforts. An American military attaché commented that "the army's air service remains paralyzed" and "it is clear that Mr. Bernardes does not have confidence in a large army contingent and does not want to run the risk of being bombed".

== Prisons ==
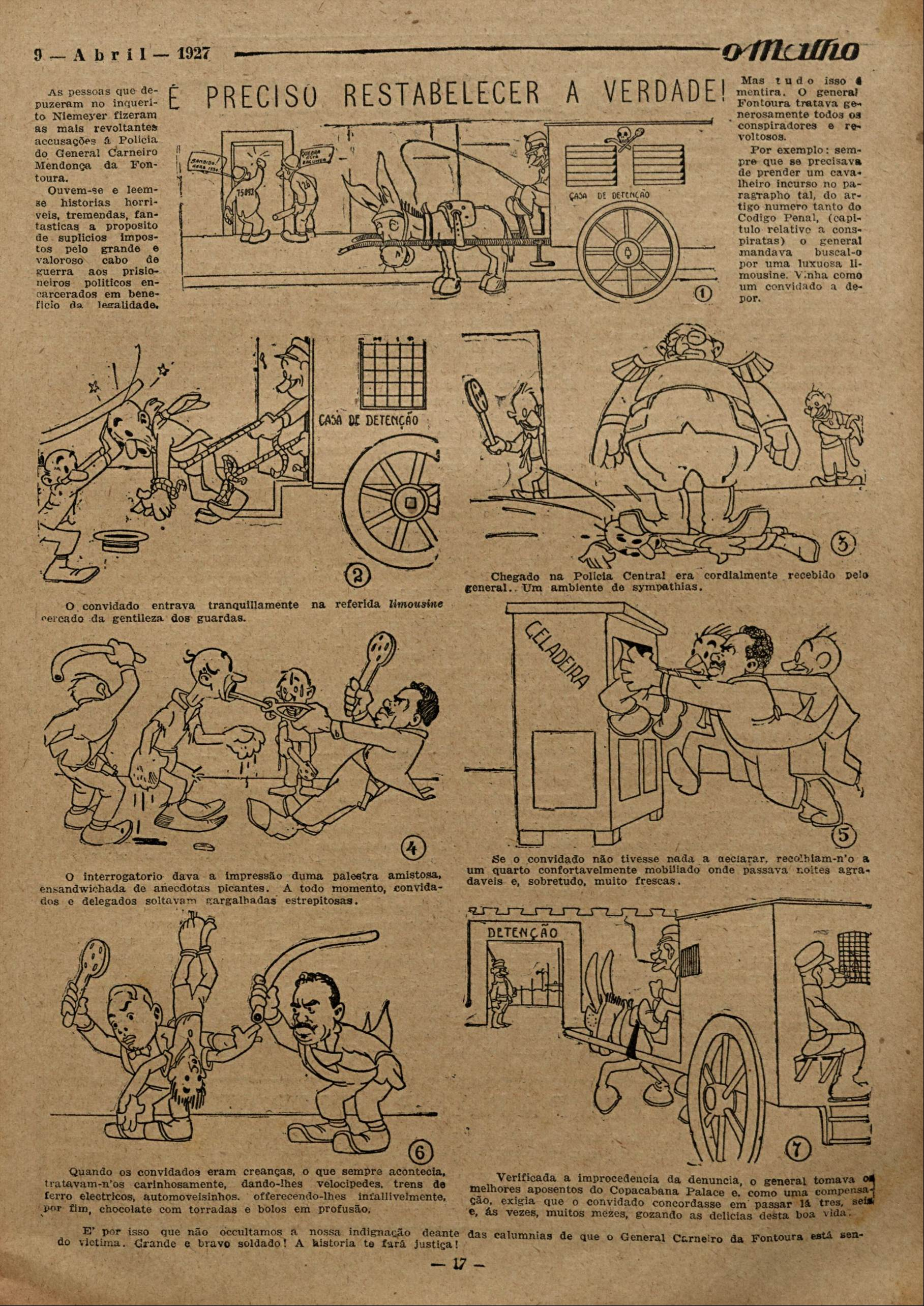
Satire in the magazine O Malho, in 1927, about the torture carried out by Carneiro da Fontoura's police

The state of emergency gave discretionary powers to the Chief of Police of the Federal District to carry out mass arrests without investigation, judicial warrant or conviction. Jails were overcrowded during this period, and prisoners were transferred to remote and isolated locations. Lawyer and tenentist Lourenço Moreira Lima estimated the number of prisoners in São Paulo at least 10,000 immediately after the rebels left the city, at the end of July 1924.

No social class was immune to political repression during the state of emergency. The prisons housed military personnel (from marshals to enlisted men) and civilians, supporters of the revolts, worker activists, politicians, journalists, lawyers, doctors, dentists, pharmacists, students, civil servants, traders and even minors. (Note: Júlio Pereira de Souza, aged 16, was arrested from July 1924 to early 1925. He had delivered to the legal troops, under a white flag, a message from his father, the rebel leader João Francisco Pereira de Souza. Adriano Metello Júnior and Tharsis Cabral de Mello, factory workers in São Paulo and minors, were also detained until mid-1925, but "no evidence was produced against them", according to the criminal case of the São Paulo Revolt. In Jaboticabal, loyalists arrested Armando Lerro and Duílio Poli, both 16 years old (Assunção 2014, p. 89-90). Medical student and minor José Celso Uchôa Cavalcanti was sent to Flores Island without being interrogated or informed of his infraction. When he wrote a letter to Dr. Mello Mattos, a judge of minors, asking him to intercede with the Ministry of Justice, the censor returned the letter, informing him that he was incommunicado. Cavalcanti was only released after clandestinely sending a letter (Aragão 2011, p. 231).) Political prisoners were deliberately placed with common criminals. Arrests of children, relatives and friends of prisoners and fugitives were common, such as Aristides Dias Lopes, the son of Isidoro Dias Lopes, leader of the tenentists since 1924.

There was torture in these establishments; according to historian Hélio Silva, "the rubber pipe, cold water, isolation, malnutrition and mistreatment, all the time" were the "black page of the loyalist reaction". Responsibility for torture can be traced in the hierarchy to marshals Carneiro da Fontoura and Setembrino de Carvalho and general Antenor Santa Cruz Pereira de Abreu, Head of the Military Cabinet of the Presidency of the Republic. The Conrado Niemeyer case, an alleged suicide that occurred in the Central Police building, and several cases of torture were discussed in the Chamber of Deputies. The campaign in Congress in favor of political prisoners emphasized that, according to the Constitution, they be allocated to places not used for ordinary prisoners. According to Everardo Dias, who wrote extensively about the poor conditions of prisons in Rio de Janeiro, the public scandal softened the treatment after July 1925, and the government sought the appearance of legal formality.

According to Everardo Dias, anyone who wanted information about a known prisoner faced advisors, letters, permissions and successive negative responses from the authorities. Insistence on requests alone already placed an individual as a suspect; "when the friend, who has just asked for the suspect's freedom, goes through the Central door to enter the street, he is arrested and goes to prison, where a friend for whom he had interceded enters". When there was no legal basis for arresting an individual, the police would deny that he was in their custody. All goods were expensive in prison, and money asked for from family members was taken by guards and other prisoners, the "pirates".

=== Military prisoners ===
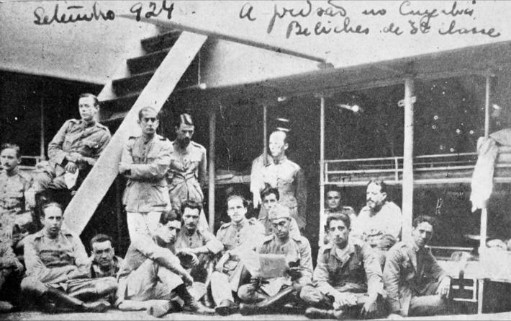
Military personnel on the prison ship Cuyabá

Hundreds of tenentists were imprisoned in the custody of the 4th Auxiliary Police Bureau and the Armed Forces. At the end of Epitácio Pessoa's term there were 118 soldiers arrested as a result of the 1922 revolt. The investigation into the 1924 revolt indicted 667 people: 193 army soldiers and 63 from the Public Force of São Paulo, 405 civilians and six unidentified individuals. Clevelândia received contingents of 250 soldiers from Rio de Janeiro and São Paulo, 119 from Amazonas and Pará, 23 from Rio de Janeiro and around 400 from the battle of Catanduvas, in the Paraná campaign. Most tenentists did not abandon their political project and lived underground, in prisons and exile. The adversities they faced collectively gave them a common identity and solidified a core of professional rebels. Rebels from distant locations were arrested together and formed new alliances.

The imprisonment of soldiers in groups alleviated the hardships of prison. In this environment, the rebels saw their comrades, received news, planned new actions, wrote to their lawyers and the press and fought for freedom. As literate men in a mostly illiterate society, the officers had important contacts and legal knowledge to organize their own defense. The status of an army officer was a privilege, even in prison, although this meant the "social death" of an individual who, in freedom, would have had a significant presence in society. In Clevelândia, imprisoned soldiers were protected by their officers. Part of the military swore loyalty to the government, abandoning their convictions, and formed an elite among the prisoners.

=== Civilian prisoners ===
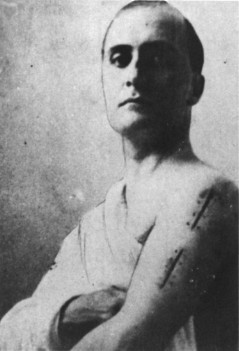
Maurício de Lacerda displaying wounds on his arm resulting from poor medical treatment in prison (Note: In a Military Police hospital, a soldier accidentally broke a needle inside his arm. Looking for the needle, a doctor made cuts on the arm without proper asepsis. The wound was stitched up, but a tumor developed on the infected arm. (Dulles 1973, p. 253).)

The reaction to the July 1922 revolt resulted in the arrest of worker leaders (anarchists and communists), state deputies from Rio de Janeiro, a police chief, a notary and especially journalists. The persecution would occur with greater intensity in the following government: shortly after the revolt of 5 July 1924, Rio police captured numerous anarchists, opposition writers and journalists. The main union leaders went to prison or underground. Foreigners involved in the revolt were deported. The confinement of anarchists, including prominent figures such as Everardo Dias and José Oiticica, sought to dismantle and intimidate the movement within the working class. Political activists surveilled since 1922 were detained in their homes and workplaces. Public demonstrations of "defeatism" in bars and taverns were grounds for arrest, although less common than arrests for distributing revolutionary propaganda leaflets.

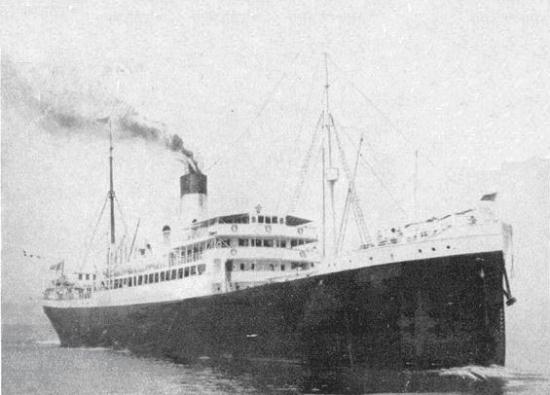
The prison ship Campos

The jails were overcrowded not only due to political prisoners, but also to the police "canoes" that arrested men who were circulating in the city after certain hours; According to Everardo Dias, "in the suburbs or suspicious neighborhoods of the city, beggars, vagrants, pederasts, idle people, scoundrels, small traders, clerks, etc., are hunted down, whoever has the misfortune to pass by at the time of the state of emergency; whether old or young, healthy or sick, crippled or perfect, clean or dirty". Many of the resulting prisoners had no connection to political dissent nor common crime. This was the practice of "city cleaning", which had already been applied previously after the Vaccine Revolt in 1904; innocent and guilty people were put together, and common criminals ranged from milk and money counterfeiters to thieves and murderers. For historian Carlo Romani, putting political and common prisoners together was a way of associating the image of the former with the latter. In Clevelândia and on the Campos prison ship, common criminals were used to discipline other prisoners.

In São Paulo, the "rebellious civilians" taken to prison included railway workers, bricklayers, coachmen, bricklayer servants, weavers, cart drivers, commercial employees and plumbers. Many were immigrants. An elderly German man of almost eighty years old was arrested in a countryside town for cheering the revolutionary general Isidoro Dias Lopes when the rebels were passing through the city. The police focused on arresting the signatories of the anarchist manifesto in favor of the revolt published by A Plebe. In the countryside, wealthy prisoners enriched the "prison door attorneys". São Paulo state senator Raul Cardoso was detained in the Paraná's countryside when he was taking a son out of the state who had signed a manifesto in favor of the revolt. He was held incommunicado, threatened with shooting and taken to Rio de Janeiro, where he was interviewed by a public prosecutor and released.

A particularly notable prisoner from high society was José Carlos de Macedo Soares, president of the São Paulo Commercial Association, accused of having been a leader of the revolution. Taken to Rio de Janeiro, Soares was imprisoned for three months and was exiled to Paris. He was one of the representatives of the upper class who had somehow negotiated with the rebels, and therefore, were chosen to demonstrate the government's strength. Other names from more bourgeois sectors of society and publicly known, such as Maurício de Lacerda, Evaristo de Morais and Edmundo Bittencourt, passed through the House of Correction in the same way as Macedo Soares.

=== Destinations and transfers ===
In Rio de Janeiro, the House of Correction, the House of Detention and the Central Police served as prisons. The soldiers stayed in the barracks of the Fire Department, the General Staff School, the Naval Battalion, the 1st and 2nd Divisional Cavalry Regiments, the Central Navy Hospital, the Central Army Hospital, the Santa Cruz Fortress, and the Laje Fort. In the ports, the prisoners went to the ships Alfenas, Benevente, Belmonte, Cuiabá, Jaceguay, Campos, Jahu, Manaus and Baependi, requisitioned by Lloyd Brasileiro, and the tugboats Audaz, Mario Alves, Tonelero, Laurindo Pinta and Tenente Cláudio. Other detainees were transported to Bom Jesus, Flores and Rasa islands. In São Paulo, the detainees were held at the Immigrants' Hostel, the Political Police Station and 4th Battalion of Caçadores.

Transfers, motivated by initial trials, prisoners' requests or to isolate them from new revolts, were so frequent that it is difficult to follow the trajectories of the imprisoned soldiers. Prisoners were generally subject to early morning transfers to undisclosed destinations. Everardo Dias believed that they were deliberately organized to torment prisoners.

The itinerary of a prisoner in the Federal District began at the Federal Police building for investigation, which could take months. Some were released and the majority went to the Houses of Correction and Detention. The poorest ones, without repercussions and considered "irreducible" by the government, could be transferred from there to the Campos prison ship. Prisoners with the greatest impact on public opinion passed from the House of Correction to the islands of Guanabara Bay (Rasa, Flores and Bom Jesus islands). Even though the islands were close to the capital, they expressed a symbolism of isolation desired by the government. The proximity of prison ships and islands proved excessive for the government, as prisoners maintained sufficient contact to continue their legal defense and seek habeas corpus. The solution was deportation to even more remote places, such as Ilha Grande, Trindade and Martim Vaz, and the most remote destination of all, the penal colony of Clevelândia.

==== Central Police ====
This was the Federal District's police headquarters, where newly captured prisoners were booked by the 4th Auxiliary Police Bureau before being transferred to the Detention and Correction Houses. It had his own prison cells, but only notorious criminals, and those with prior records, went directly to them. Workers, poor political activists and dangerous prisoners, but whose fate was uncertain, spent an initial period in the "refrigerator", the most famous prison cell of the Central Police. In its eight by ten meter room, 40 to 190 people would stay, sometimes for weeks.

==== Correction and Detention Houses ====
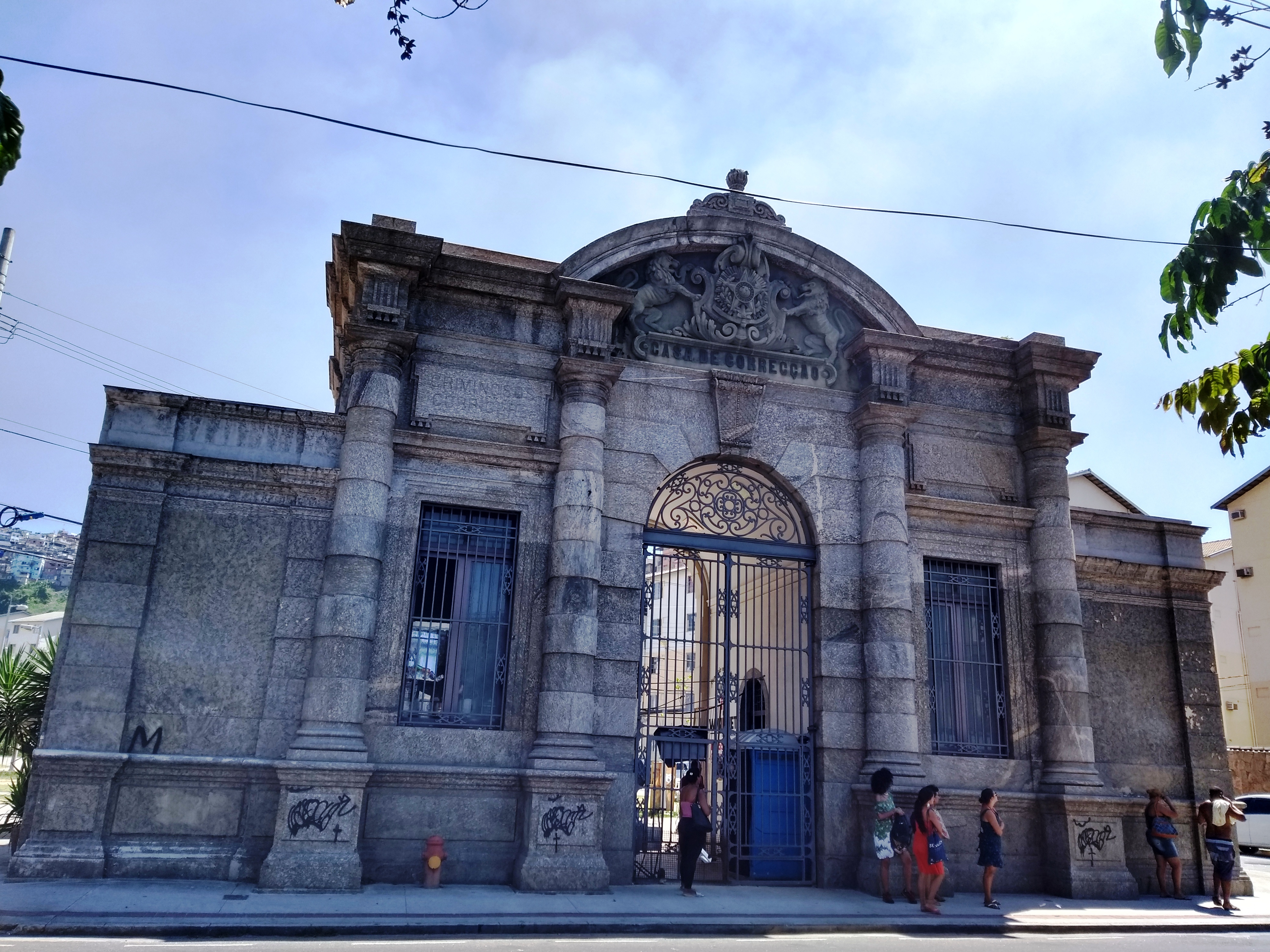
The old House of Correction's portico in 2018, when the prison complex had already been demolished

The Houses of Detention and Correction formed a penitentiary complex (Note: "The House of Detention corresponded - until 2003, when the demolition of the Frei Caneca complex began, to the Milton Dias Moreira Prison. It was extinguished in 2006 and was better known as the Political Prison (or popularly as P.P.), for housing prisoners subject to the National Security Law during the period of military governments in Brazil. It was located next to the Félix Pacheco Institute, in Estácio, in the city of Rio de Janeiro. The last one was recently called Lemos de Brito Penitentiary. The Frei Caneca penitentiary complex was partially in operation until that year, and its last building was demolished in July 2010" (Aragão 2011, p. 182).) managed by the Ministry of Justice. Both houses had the same director, who reported to the Chief of Police. They were essentially intended for temporary stays, such as those of unconvicted prisoners. No prisoner should be detained for more than eight days without starting their trial. In reality, the prison was overcrowded and many political prisoners had no progress in their trials. Conditions were already precarious in previous decades, as the 1910-1911 Report of the Minister of Justice and Interior Affairs attested. A special pavilion for tuberculosis patients had to be created in 1923. Everardo Dias reported bodies of patients or victims of torture being dragged through the corridors.

The 1891 Constitution established that political prisoners would be kept apart from the common people. From 5 to 6 July 1924, the House of Correction received military personnel, politicians and journalists such as Mauricio de Lacerda, José Oitica, Paulo Bittencourt, Evaristo de Moraes, Paulo P. de Lacerda, Raul Paula Lopes, Edmundo Bittencourt, José Macedo Soares, José Joaquim Teixeira, general Ximeno de Villeroy and Mário Rodrigues. In his correspondence to the Supreme Military Court, lieutenant Carlos Chevalier listed the names of fraudsters, thieves and murderers, such as Rocca, Carlitto, Oldemar Lacerda, Piolho de Cobra, Dente de Burro, Sete Coroas, Meia Noite, Sete Estrelas and 13 da Lapa, put together with generals and colonels with whom they were imprisoned. The legal situation was resolved by a decree on 5 November 1924 that designated the 9th and 10th galleries "as a private prison for detention due to the state of emergency".

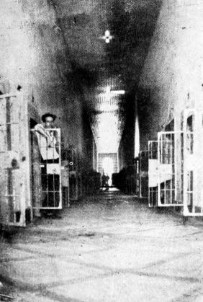
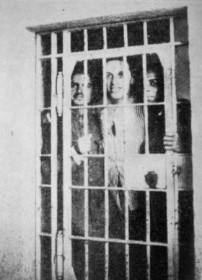
Military prisoners at the House of Correction

Political prisoners had the same treatment as ordinary prisoners, except for the obligation to work in workshops during the day, from which army officers obtained an exemption. The prisoners' work was used in various public works and, according to lieutenant Chevalier, in "gifts to the government", such as an Arab prisoner who worked in Artur Bernardes' private library. The work was paid, although the value was probably negligible. Article 43 of the 1890 Criminal Code authorized compulsory work as a penalty to be applied to prisoners.

Accommodation in the House of Detention was separated according to the social origin of the prisoners. One end had four "halls". The first received lawyers, teachers, engineers and other more senior prisoners, who had privileges such as sunbathing, better food, beds, washing facilities, etc. The second hall was for students, staff and other prisoners recommended to the director, also with privileges. The third room was for prisoners of good social standard, but without a godfather or who refused to ask the management for favors. The fourth hall was for the "incorrigible" ones, workers and activists. Poorer prisoners were held underground.

==== Prison ships ====
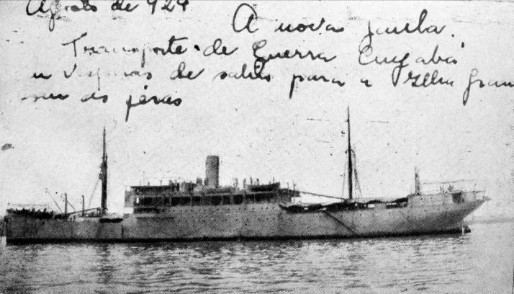
Prison ship Cuyabá

The prison ships used in the state of emergency were mostly of German origin, either seized by the Brazilian government in 1917, or acquired as World War I reparations in the Treaty of Versailles. They belonged to Lloyd Brasileiro, and were requisitioned and provisionally incorporated by the Brazilian Navy, as its warships no longer had room for prisoners.

Alfenas was commanded by navy officers from 10 July to 6 December 1922, serving as the first prison ship for that year's rebels. Benevente served as a prison in April 1924, when the rebels it housed were transferred to Cuyabá, anchored on Ilha Grande. Military personnel from the navy and army, from different locations, passed by this ship. Jaceguay received military prisoners in São Paulo.

Campos had the worst reputation. It received workers, soldiers, sailors and sergeants, but no officers. Many of them arrived physically weakened from the 4th Police Bureau and the House of Detention, sometimes returning to the latter's infirmary. According to reports from prisoners, they were subjected to torture, including whipping, by "notable rascals from Rio de Janeiro" employed as supervisors, in the words of Everardo Dias. Personal belongings were sometimes stolen by employees. The diet consisted of a glass of coffee and bread in the morning, a scoop of beans with flour for lunch and another for dinner. The prisoners had a ten-hour day of work in painting, cleaning rust, decks, machines and boilers, unraveling ropes and cleaning, ranching and washing clothes. People slept on an iron plate in the basement.

==== Islands ====
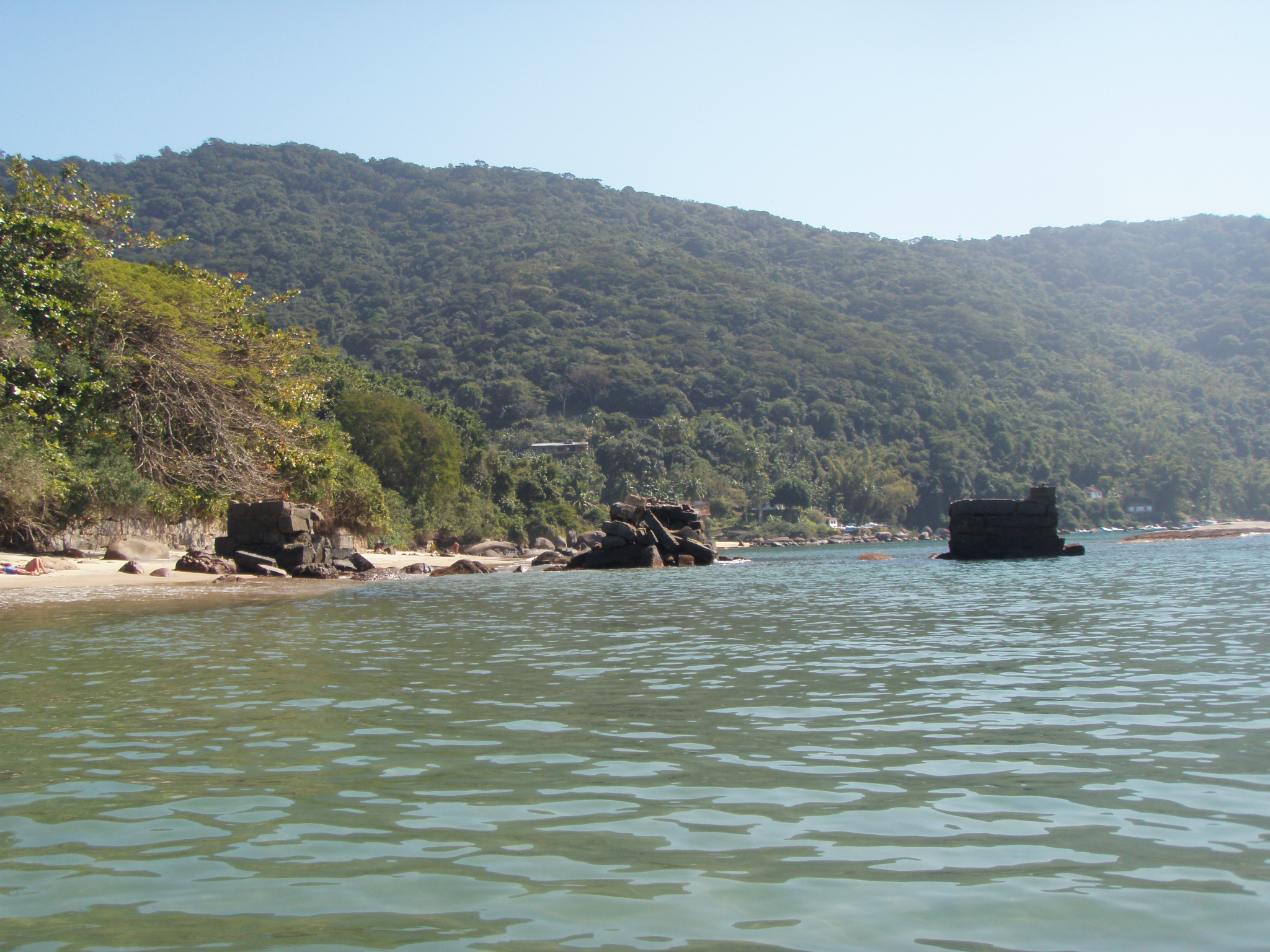
Ruins of the Lazareto pier on Ilha Grande

The navy facilities on Ilha das Cobras, including the Naval Battalion and the colonial prison, received dozens of army officers in 1922 and numerous sailors, corporals and non-commissioned officers at the end of 1924. A prisoner's letter to Moniz Sodré described underground prison cells cramped and poorly lit, where several people suffered from contagious diseases, bronchitis and tuberculosis.

Ilha Rasa, two-hours away from the Navy Arsenal, received prisoners from the Naval Battalion, navy soldiers from the Jaceguay hydrographic aviso and other civilians and military personnel, such as Aristides Dias Lopes, Everardo Dias, José Oiticica, Edmundo Bittencourt, Paulo Bittencourt, general Augusto Ximeno de Villeroy, Maurício de Lacerda and José Eduardo Macedo Soares. The island overlooked the city of Rio de Janeiro, but was isolated and barren, with sparse vegetation and rocky terrain. There was no medical care, the accommodation consisted of wooden huts with zinc roofs and the drinking water was what could be collected from the roofs and puddles. The drinking water sent by ship was described by Maurício de Lacerda as a "terrible purgative", and the food as "the worst kind of fried meat, mediocre dried cod and old, wormy beans". Contact with the outside world was exclusively through censored letters and articles delivered three times a week by tugboat. Macedo Soares was rescued by a group of fishermen and left in Copacabana; Shortly afterwards, he requested asylum at the Argentine embassy. To prevent further escapes, sentries stood guard at the highest points of the island and fishing boats began to be warned with gunfire when they approached too close.

The infrastructure was better on Flores Island, where there was an Immigrant Hostel managed by the Ministry of Agriculture. Military prisoners were housed in a pavilion with separate rooms, while civilians were in the luggage hold. 60 prisoners were transferred to Bom Jesus Island for a matter of jurisdiction: Flores Island was located in the state of Rio de Janeiro, while Bom Jesus Island belonged to the Federal District, and therefore was not considered a destination for exile. Visits were easier and their schedules were made more flexible. However, the location was a hundred meters from Sapucaia Island, where there was a garbage dump. One of the prisoners was Maurício de Lacerda, who denounced unhealthy accommodation, poor food, lack of medical care and death threats in a letter to deputy Azevedo Lima.

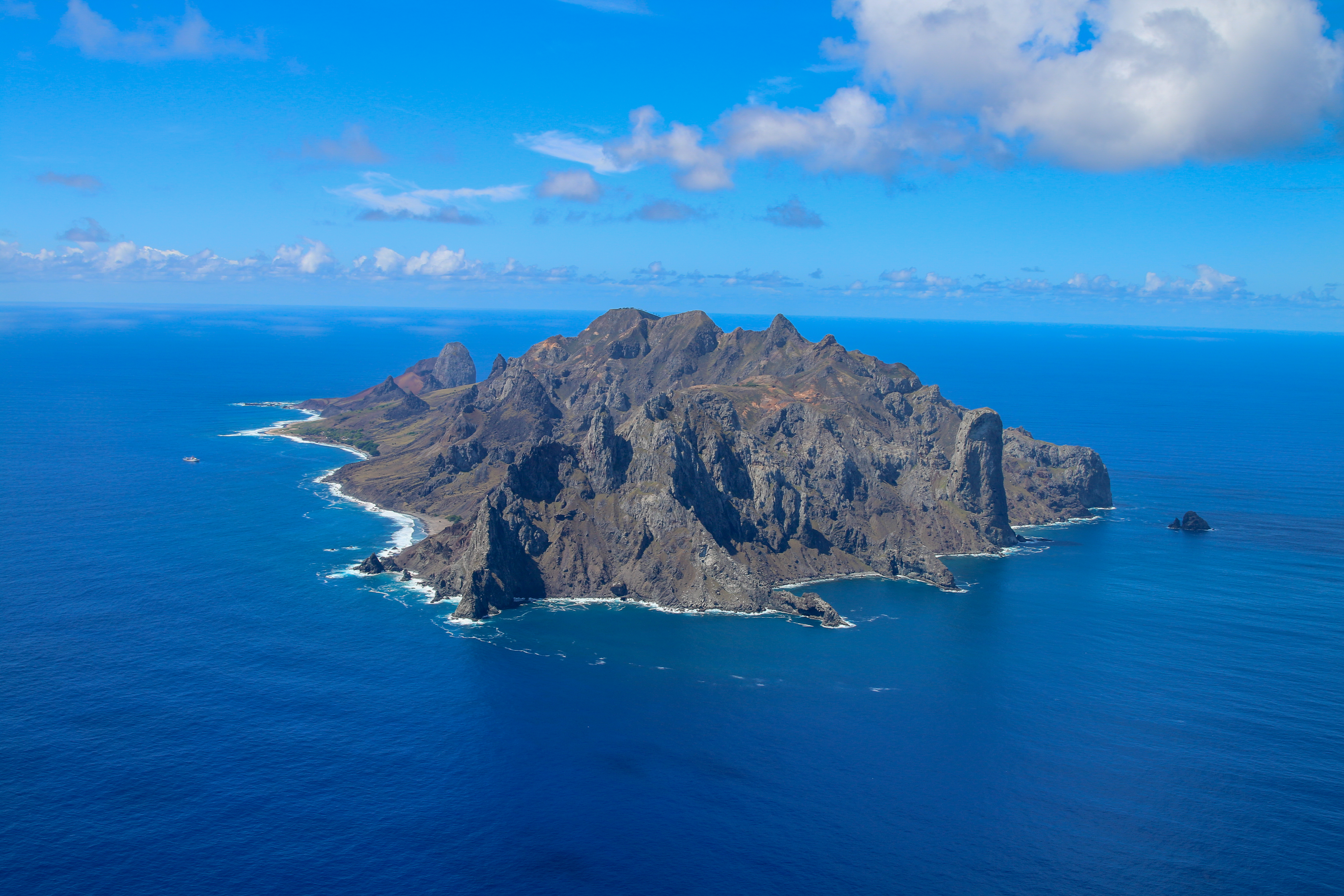
Trindade Island

Ilha Grande, 150 kilometers from Rio de Janeiro and 400 kilometers from São Paulo, had two prison establishments, Lazareto, a former immigrant quarantine center converted into a political prison, and the Dois Rios Correctional Colony (CCDR), which received misdemeanors. The Lazareto prison was designated as a private military prison on 15 January 1925, receiving many military prisoners, while the CCDR prison population was declining.

Trindade Island, 1,167 kilometers off the coast of Espírito Santo and 2,400 kilometers from Africa, received its first wave of civilian and military prisoners in December 1924. Trindade received a hundred military prisoners and had thirty soldiers and some officers as guards in June 1926. It was chosen as a place of exile due to its difficult access and lack of infrastructure: it was uninhabited and the prisoners were housed in canvas barracks. It only had one safe landing beach, where the relay troops, provisions, doctors and news arrived. These ship visits did not bring meat and the prisoners resorted to hunting and fishing. When the penultimate ship brought live bulls, some prisoners already had vitamin deficiency. Others suffered from beriberi and polyneuritis. The latter caused five fatal cases, according to a telegram sent to Ilha das Cobras on 21 June 1926. Despite the deaths, the prisoners had time to read, walk and name the local geography with revolutionary names.

==== Clevelândia ====
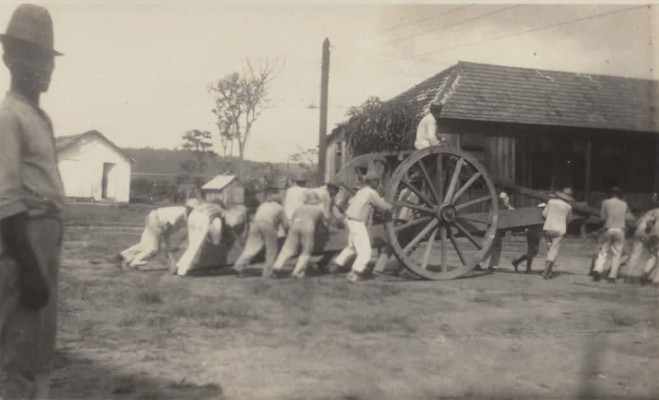
Pneal labor used in construction in Clevelândia

Artur Bernardes earned the nickname "President Clevelândia" from his detractors. Until his death he would be associated with the penal colony created in the current district of Clevelândia do Norte, Amapá, on Brazil's border with French Guiana. The "Cleveland Agricultural Nucleus" had been opened on the banks of the Oyapock River in 1922. Its initial population of 200 employees, traders and settlers, attracted by the propaganda of a fertile, healthy and civilized land, was already in decline in 1924, when the first wave of prisoners arrived at the mouth of the Oyapock on 26 December. Estimates of the number of prisoners range from 946 in the official report to 1,630. They were tenentists, trade unionists, anarchists, common criminals and beggars, captured in Amazonas, Pará, Rio de Janeiro, São Paulo and Paraná. Security was the responsibility of the 26th Battalion of Caçadores.

According to Bernardes, the idea came from Agriculture Minister Miguel Calmon or chief engineer Gentil Norberto. Censorship hid the matter from the press until the end of the state of emergency, after which the "truth about Clevelândia" was a huge scandal. Government officials described the place as a "very common agricultural colony" and "peaceful cassava plantations", and oppositionists described it as the "green hell", "Brazilian Siberia" and other nicknames with the connotation of exile and demographic emptiness.

The specialized bibliography on the topic demonstrates a high mortality rate among prisoners. The report Journey to the Cleveland Colonial Center, presented to the Ministry of Agriculture, counted 262 escapes and 491 deaths out of a total of 946 prisoners. The place was hot and humid and diseases such as malaria and dysentery spread without sufficient medical care. Historian Carlo Romani characterized Clevelândia as a space for forced labor for prisoners. Another historian, Paulo Sérgio Pinheiro, also used the term, while Alexandre Samis only used "penal colony".

== 1926 Constitutional reform ==
On 3 September 1926 the Bernardes government managed to promulgate a revision to the 1891 Constitution, discussed and approved while the state of emergency was in force. Some of its modifications dealt with appeals, prohibiting judicial appeals against the declaration and denying the courts jurisdiction of the acts carried out by the Executive and Legislative branches as a result of the state of emergency. The constitutional reform also indicated the situations in which federal intervention could occur in the states, gave the president partial veto power over bills approved by Congress and restricted the applicability of habeas corpus. The tendency was to strengthen the president to the detriment of other branches and the state sphere.

Until then, habeas corpus had broad application and could be used by citizens against any type of action by the government that violated a fundamental right. The number of habeas corpus requests in the Supreme Court increased during Bernardes' government, precisely as a reaction of those affected by the state of emergency. Habeas corpus was the only legal instrument with which lawyers could be productive. Military prisoners used it to allow the review of desertion lawsuits, refunding bonus discounts or payment discounts in prisons, regularizing future full salaries, ending incommunicado detention, obtaining transfers and other measures. The reform sought to reduce habeas corpus to the strict sense of a guarantee on freedom of movement. These changes prompted the opposition to accuse Bernardes of dictatorial intentions.

== Relaxation in the Washington Luís government ==
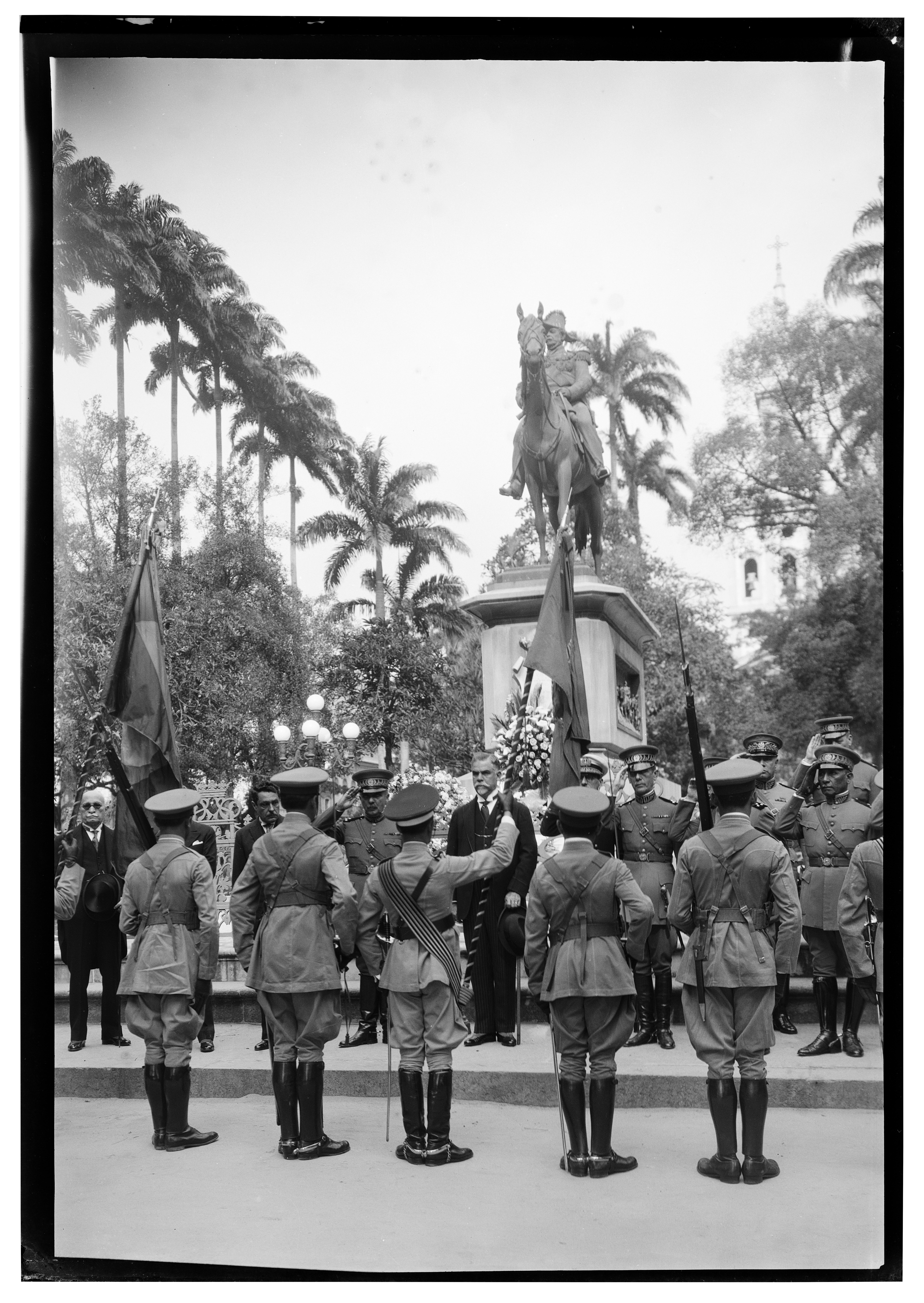
Washington Luís with military and civilian authorities

The 1926 presidential election proceeded without much dispute, confirming the transition of power to the governor of São Paulo, Washington Luís. He took office on 15 November 1926. Luís' new police chief, Coriolano de Góes, took over at the end of the month and released 356 detainees without trial in Colônia de Dois Rios and another 161 from the military prison on Ilha das Cobras. There was a general expectation of improvement in the tense political atmosphere. Censorship ceased. The press expressed some sympathy for the new president's liberal decisions, but mainly irony and accusations against the government.

The last prisoners from Clevelândia disembarked in Rio de Janeiro on 22 February 1927. The truth about what occurred in the penal colony became one of the main topics of debate and opposition. The newspapers printed statements such as "the horrors of Clevelândia", "the extermination of prisoners", "the crimes of the Bernardes government", "the exile of plague and death" and "the hecatomb of Clevelândia". The exhausted Prestes Column went into exile in Bolivia at the beginning of February.

Workers' and trade union organization and activities began their recovery in 1926 and especially in 1927. The tenentists ended the military campaigns that began in 1922 having built an image of heroism and sympathy in the press and disgruntled politicians, which they would take advantage of for a new campaign. The political climate during Washington Luís' term was relatively peaceful, and in 1928 he announced that "there are not, there cannot be, revolutions or revolts in this country. There is no environment or elements for this, everyone is within their duties. We can consider the period of riots and rebellions over". However, at the end of his term, Brazil's economy was hit by the Great Depression, the oligarchies did not reach a consensus on the presidential succession, and dissidents in the political elite joined forces with the tenentists to carry out the Revolution of 1930, deposing Washington Luís and ending the First Brazilian Republic.
