= Rua Uruguaiana =

Commercial street in Rio de Janeiro, Brazil

Coordinates: 22.9038°S 43.1802°W

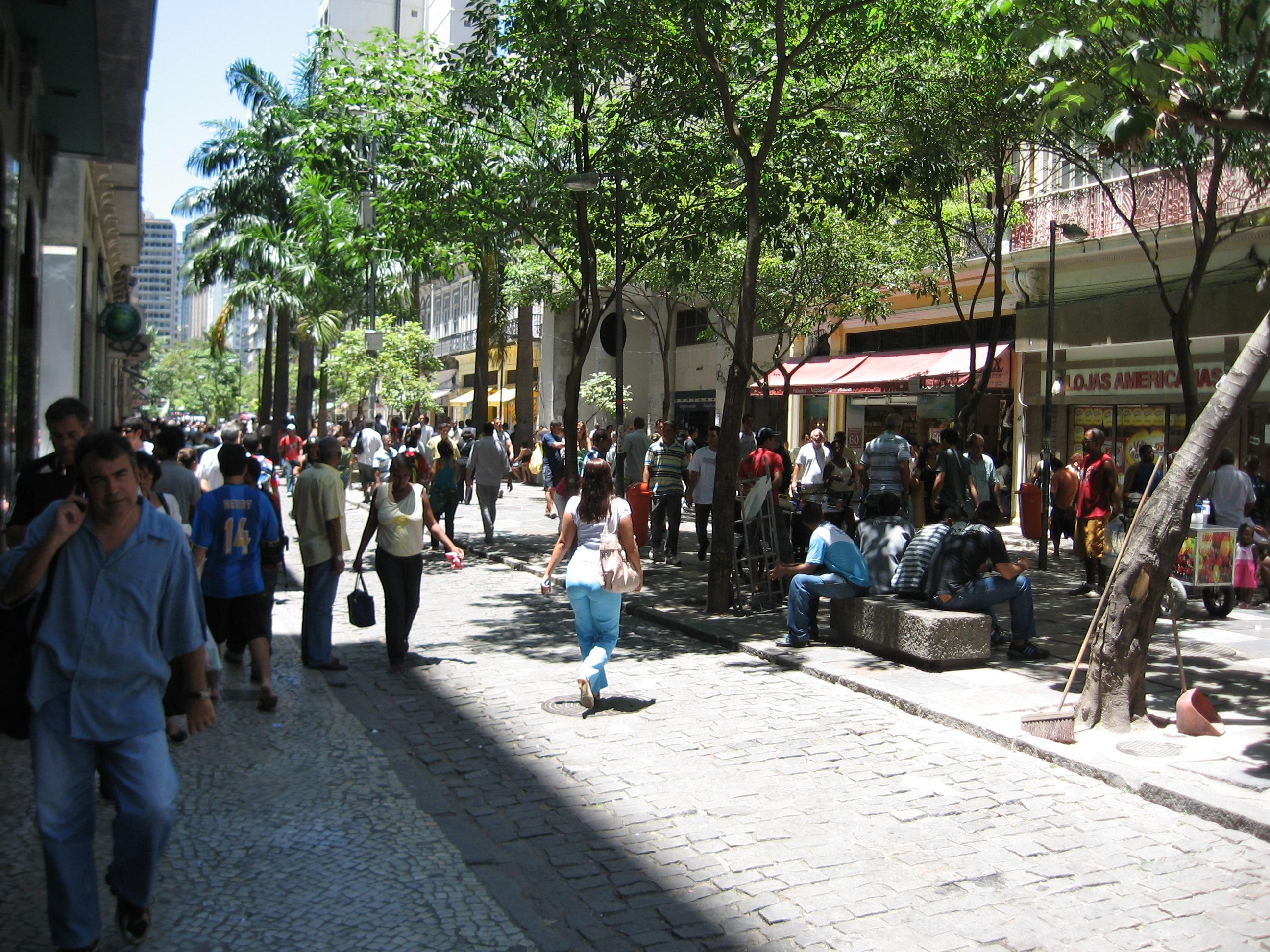
Rua Uruguaiana

Rua Uruguaiana is a popular shopping street in Rio de Janeiro, Brazil.

== History ==
In 1994 on Uruguaiana, Rio de Janeiro mayor César Maia inaugurated the Uruguaiana Popular Market (also known as "camelódromo da Uruguaiana") to shelter the street vendors that worked nearby. Due to the common practice of selling illegal counterfeit products, the area is usually a stage for police operations.

The market is the mecca of piracy in Rio de Janeiro.

== See also ==
- Rua 25 de Março
