= Department of Political and Social Order =

Brazilian secret police

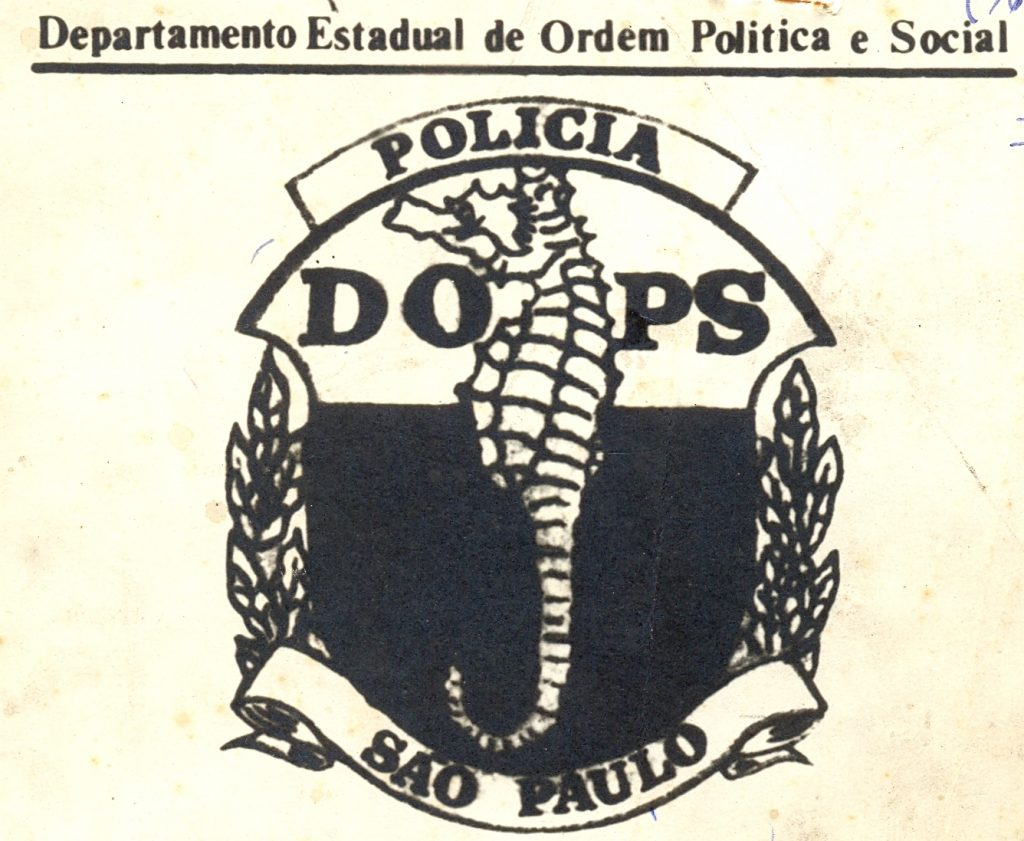

The Department of Political and Social Order (Portuguese: Departamento de Ordem Política e Social) or DOPS was a secret police organ of the Brazilian government, notably used by the Estado Novo of Getúlio Vargas and the military dictatorship established by the coup of 1964. The DOPS was established in 1924. It was responsible for controlling and repressing political movements against the government.

Under the military dictatorship installed in 1964, the DOPS was overseen by Sérgio Paranhos Fleury, who was accused of torture and homicide but died before trial.
