= Lightning Column =

1926 tenentist uprising in Brazil

- Part of Tenentism
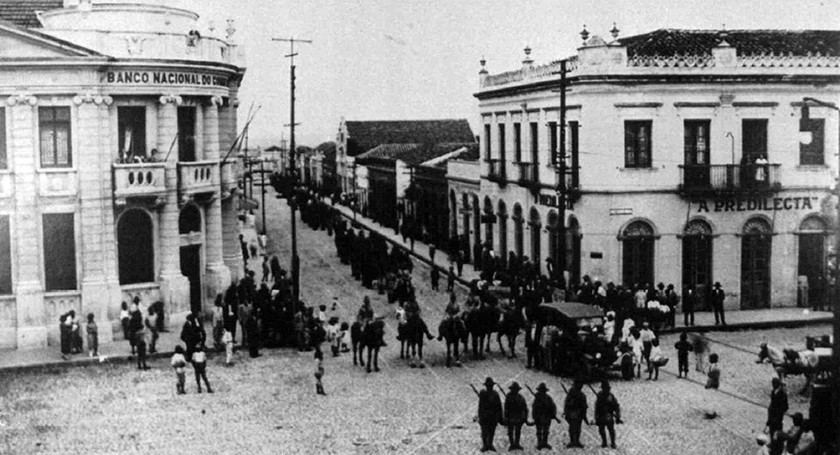
- The Military Brigade in the streets of Santa Maria after its victory
Date	5 November 1926 (Note: The date of Leonel Rocha's incursion is controversial, according to Aragão 2021 which cites dates from November to December. Meirelles 2002, p. 616 and Cabral 1937, p. 430 give the earliest date, 5 November.) – January 1927
Location	Southern Brazil
Result	Loyalist victory

Belligerents
Rebels: Liberating Alliance; Tenentist rebels	Brazil: Brazilian Army; Public Forces: Rio Grande do Sul; Santa Catarina; São Paulo

Commanders and leaders
Isidoro Dias Lopes; Alcides Etchegoyen; Nelson Etchegoyen; Zeca Neto	Borges de Medeiros; Eurico de Andrade Neves

Strength
1,000 men	Unknown

The Lightning Column (Portuguese: Coluna Relâmpago) was the last tenentist uprising, fought in southern Brazil from November 1926. Under the command of general Isidoro Dias Lopes, exiled in Argentina, military and civilian leaders of the government's opposition in Rio Grande do Sul combined incursions across Brazilian borders with uprisings in army garrisons in Rio Grande do Sul. The uprising, contrary to the federal and state governments, intended to indirectly support the Prestes Column, which was in Mato Grosso. Some conspirators prematurely started the revolt before the scheduled date (26 December), compromising the campaign plan, which was quickly dismantled by the loyalist army and state forces.

Previous revolts in Rio Grande do Sul were suppressed in 1924 and 1925, but the defeated rebels remained in neighboring countries. On 13–14 November, there were beginnings of revolt in the garrisons of São Gabriel and Bagé, followed on the 16th by that of Santa Maria, where the biggest fighting took place. On 7 December there was another army revolt, in São Leopoldo, but it was put down on the same day.

The Santa Maria rebels, led by the Etchegoyen brothers, did not overcome loyalist resistance of the Military Brigade of Rio Grande do Sul, even though they had artillery and greater numbers. After more than a day of urban combat, which damaged many buildings and led to the population fleeing, they withdrew from the city. Pursued by the loyalists, they were intercepted by the Auxiliary Corps (CA) near Seival, in Caçapava. With machine guns in good defensive positions, they defeated successive cavalry charges and wounded the enemy commander, Oswaldo Aranha.

The Seival rebels joined warlord Zeca Neto, coming from Uruguay, who led a war of movement until his defeat near São Sepé, on 25 December. Other chiefs and soldiers crossed the border to support Neto, unaware of the defeat. Júlio Barrios' campaign, from the extreme west of the state to the Santana do Livramento region, ended, as did Zeca Neto's, with his return to exile at the beginning of January. Parallel to these movements, Leonel Rocha entered Brazil through the Contestado region in November, seeking to cut the São Paulo-Rio Grande Railway, but his three-month long journey also ended in defeat.

== Background ==
Brazilians defeated in the 1924 tenentist revolts formed a community of exiles in neighboring countries (Paraguay, Argentina and Uruguay). They were soldiers from the Brazilian Army, Navy and the Public Force of São Paulo and civilian leaders. All of them recognized the leadership of general Isidoro Dias Lopes and the "civilian leader of the revolution", Joaquim Francisco de Assis Brasil, leader of the Liberating Alliance, an opposition group in Rio Grande do Sul. The exiles maintained contact with each other and responded to any call from Isidoro. They met with political leaders and sent and received food, weapons, letters and packages to their families. The movement had its own general staff and finances, the "revolution's coffers".

Some rebels continued the fight in remote regions of Brazil, forming the Prestes Column. They maintained contact with the exiles, who prepared new revolts in their support. Despite being too old to go on campaign, Isidoro Dias Lopes planned incursions across the border, coordinated with civilian and military allies from the Rio Grande do Sul garrisons. The strong association with civilian politics was the peculiarity of the tenentist movement in that state. The lieutenant officers and the "liberators" from Rio Grande do Sul had different objectives; the latter wanted to overthrow the governor of Rio Grande do Sul, Borges de Medeiros, and the former, the president of Brazil, Artur Bernardes. But many of the rebel officers were from Rio Grande do Sul, mixing causes. Due to the high polarization of politics in the state, Rio Grande do Sul officials were either "liberators" or government supporters.

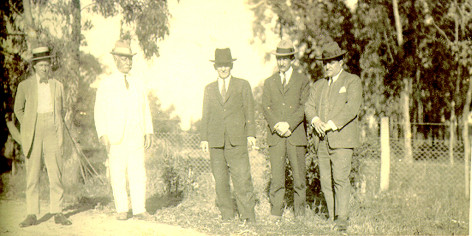
Assis Brasil and Isidoro Dias Lopes, second and third from left to right respectively

The exiles' conspiracy faced the scarcity of resources and the police and diplomatic measures of the Brazilian and Rio Grande do Sul governments. The fight in Rio Grande do Sul, lost in 1924, was renewed in September 1925. The new revolt was a disaster. The military uprising did not occur, and only one of the border incursions took place, being quickly expelled from Brazilian territory. Even so, Lopes was preparing yet another offensive.

In March 1926, a sergeant from the Aviation Squadron Group (GEA), a Military Aviation unit, reported to the command of the 3rd Military Region the officers' participation in a conspiracy. The information reached the Ministry of War and resulted in orders for the region to "have the devices destroyed, occupy the camp with a trusted detachment and subject the officers to investigation, sending those who were compromised as prisoners to Rio". At the suggestion of the commander, major Martins, the measures adopted were less extreme, rendering the planes unusable by removing parts.

In October 1926, two years had passed since the first revolt in Rio Grande do Sul. The Prestes Column was fighting in Mato Grosso. On the 24th, the Column command met and decided to end the fight, heading towards the border with Bolivia. The troops were already exhausted, and the command hoped to negotiate an amnesty with Washington Luís, Bernardes' successor as president of Brazil, who would take office on 15 November. The Column's emissaries (Lourenço Moreira Lima and Djalma Soares Dutra) arrived the day before in Paso de los Libres, Argentina, where Lopes lived. Lopes viewed Washington Luís as negatively as Artur Bernardes, but agreed with the emigration. He only asked that the Column hold out for another two months, giving time for the new revolt he was planning.

== Preparation ==
The conspirators scheduled their action for 26 December. The work was long, raising resources and individuals. Lopess' General Staff, headed by Fernando Távora, had a detailed plan; he "made reports on the loyalist, Armed Forces and police personnel; a summary of the largest civilian groups in the center, smaller groups and concentrations mobilized near the borders, including their armament, in addition to a survey of telegraph stations, production of maps". Secret recruitment and propaganda centers operated in Porto Alegre, Santa Maria, Uruguaiana and Rivera, in Uruguay.

One of the committed civilians, Leonel Rocha, remembered Lopes' confidence: "there was no well-prepared revolution like this; If we miss half, we still have too much". A civilian, Rocha was one of the veteran revolutionaries committed to the revolt, and therefore "incorrigible", in the words of Borges de Medeiros. Another veteran, Honório Lemes, did not fight after his defeat in 1925, but his nephew Alfredo supported the life in exile of the sailors of the battleship São Paulo who revolted in 1924 and took part in the new uprisings.

The plan consisted of a four-column invasion across the border, coordinated with uprisings in army units in Rio Grande do Sul. One of the most important garrisons would be Santa Maria, the largest military hub and railway center in the state. The concentration point would be in Caçapava, a municipality with a strong opposition presence. Parallel to the campaign in Rio Grande do Sul, one of the columns would enter Santa Catarina and Paraná to cut the São Paulo-Rio Grande Railway. After the victory in the south, the rebels would join the Prestes Column, coming from Mato Grosso, to march against São Paulo.

== Revolts in the garrisons ==
=== Bagé and São Gabriel ===
Despite any order from Lopes, on the night of 13 to 14 November there was an uprising among soldiers of the 9th Independent Cavalry Regiment (RCI), in São Gabriel. Led by sergeant Walter Corrêa da Silva, the rebels went to Ponte Seca, where they briefly fought against police and civilian forces during the early hours of the morning. Lieutenant Vicente Mário de Castro, involved in the conspiracy in another local unit (the 1st Battery of the 6th Horse Artillery Group), advised them to withdraw to Caçapava. Convinced that the revolt was premature, the lieutenant remained in São Gabriel, waiting for a better time. The rebels of the 9th RCI took refuge in the estancia of opposition colonel Favorino Dias, in Seival, Caçapava.

Another sergeant from São Gabriel was in Bagé, where he rebelled the soldiers at 01:00 on 14 November. This beginning of revolt was suppressed inside the barracks, at the cost of the life of a loyalist lieutenant.

The hastiness of the uprising would be fatal. According to historian Coralio Cabeda, "the revolution was already born dead". Not all exiles were ready, and the surprise factor was lost. The state government and the command of the 3rd Military Region immediately took action against the conspiracies. Despite the precipitation, general Lopes called the other conspirators into action so that the sergeants would not be abandoned. The next revolt would be "an almost desperate attempt to keep the revolutionary torch burning". The date of 14 November can be related to the desire to obstruct the inauguration of Washington Luís.

The 1st Cavalry Regiment (RC) of the Military Brigade, based in Santa Maria, sent its 4th Squadron to São Gabriel. Another formation in the city, the 5th Infantry Brigade, placed the Aviation Squadron Group on alert. Colonel Enéas Pompílio Pires, brigade commander, requested aerial reconnaissance, which was not possible; Of the Group's 30 planes, the only ones capable of flying were the four from the 1st Bombardment Squadron, from Alegrete, one of which had been sent to Porto Alegre. Second lieutenant Idílio Aleixo went to pick up one of the planes in Alegrete, where he was arrested by the local garrison, who deemed the mission to be very suspicious.

=== Santa Maria ===
==== Rumors ====
Even before the revolts in São Gabriel and Bagé, the atmosphere was tense in Santa Maria. There was much talk about an army uprising, to be launched on 15 November, on the holiday of the Proclamation of the Republic. Inside the army barracks, it was believed that there was a revolt by the Military Brigade garrison due to non-payment of wages. Since the previous month, a rumor had been spread that Washington Luís would dissolve the army, leaving only the state forces.

The 5th Infantry Brigade, based in Santa Maria, kept officers and sergeants on standby in their homes. Its commander, colonel Enéas Pompílio Pires, knew of the commitment of some of his subordinates to the conspiracy, and sought to avoid a conflict within the barracks. A stronger measure against the revolt would be strict readiness, but possibly the conspirators were even within the commander's intelligence service, leaving him poorly informed about the revolts in São Gabriel and Bagé. The conspirators, in turn, mistakenly believed in the success of previous uprisings, and became more confident after the 4th Squadron of the 1st RC left the city.

Major Aníbal Garcia Barão, interim commander of this regiment, took precautions by keeping it ready. Only one platoon, heavily armed, participated in the 15 November parade. Despite expectations, the ceremonies occurred without incidents. At night, army soldiers confirmed to the major that the revolt was imminent. All personnel from the regiment in Santa Maria spent the night in the barracks.

==== Beginning ====
The uprising began at midnight from 15 to 16 November. In the 5th Horse Artillery Regiment, the brothers and first lieutenants Alcides and Nelson Gonçalves Etchegoyen arrested several officers, organized the troops and took them to the barracks of the 7th Infantry Regiment. At 03:00, they entered the gate, arrested the sentry and took the weapons of the Guard Corps. They also had two first lieutenants from the regiment, Iguatemi Moreira and Heitor Lobato Valle, sergeants, civilians in uniform and three cannons positioned near the barracks. The loyalist officers were arrested, the storeroom was broken into and the soldiers were woken up by screams that the Military Brigade was attacking the regiment.

At 05:30 or 05:45 the first cannon shots were fired, seeking to ward off an armed column that was approaching the 7th RI in drill order — in reality, they were students from Ginásio Santa Maria, candidates for reservists of Tiro de Guerra No. 36, walking along Coronel Niederauer Street on the way to training. None of the students were injured.

The noise of the cannons woke up colonel Enéas, who was sleeping in the barracks of the 5th Infantry Brigade, next to the barracks of the 7th RI. When he opened the window, soldiers from the 5th RAM and civilians on horseback pointed their weapons at him, and lieutenant Alcides Etchegoyen ordered him to retreat, as this would not guarantee his life. The colonel was trapped in the General Headquarters, with his telephone unusable and sentries on guard. The commander of the 7th RI suffered the same fate. Other loyalist officers managed to escape and report to the Military Brigade, including lieutenant colonel Cândido Alves de Mesquita, effective commander of the 5th RAM, who took command of the city and put major Barão in charge of its defense.

Based five kilometers from Santa Maria, the Aviation Squadron Group received an ultimatum to take sides or be bombed. The base was vulnerable to artillery, there were only 40 men and 18 rifles and the officers noted the risk of subordinates joining the revolt. The commander decided it was better to retreat to join the other loyalists in the region. The troops marched through fields and wires, avoiding rebel patrols. Its guide was government colonel Ramiro de Oliveira, a property owner next to the Group's headquarters. On the afternoon of the following day, the troops were already in Camobi, from where they telegraphed to the 3rd Military Region.

==== Urban combat ====
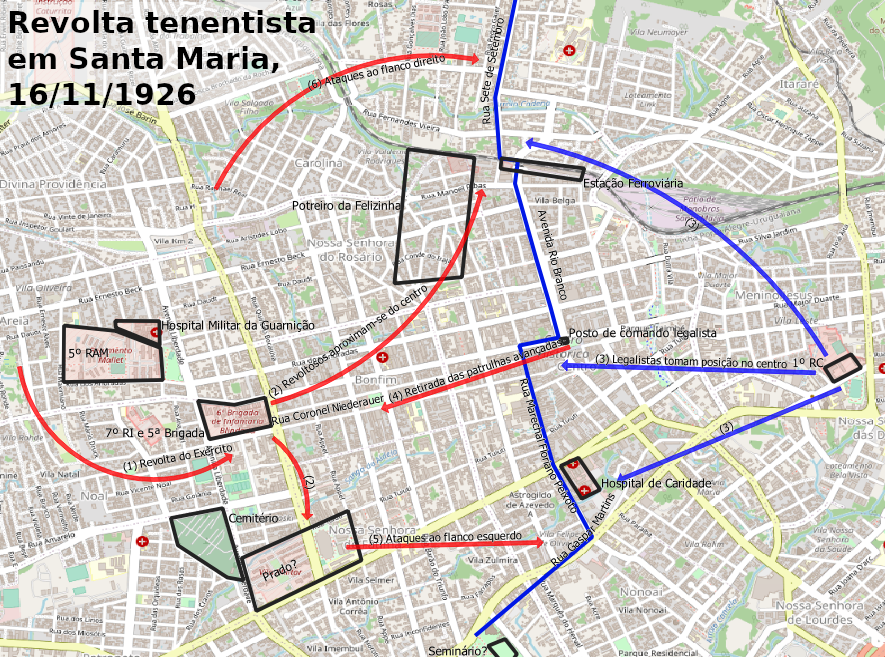
Map of military operations in Santa Maria

At the first sound of the cannons, major Barão withdrew the 1st RC from its barracks, on the other side of the city, as it would be vulnerable to bombardment. At 07:00 he took his regiment to the city center on horseback and in requisitioned automobiles. Mounted rebels patrols, identified by red scarves, withdrew from the central streets to more distant positions. (Note: "Arriving at Saldanha Marinho Square, they were faced with a picket on horseback from the Military Brigade, which made them retreat to Saturnino de Brito Square" (Santos 2016, p. 73). "The men of the 1st regiment set out to approach the pre-determined positions, which were reached without opposition, as the rebel patrols retreated precipitously as the legal force approached". (Ribeiro 1953, p. 445).) The brigadiers occupied the banks, the Municipal Quartermaster's Office, the National Telegraph and the Railway Station and established a line of trenches towards the north–south, dividing the city in half.

The leadership of the revolt found itself in the unexpected and unwanted situation of facing the Military Brigade in the city center. The rebels began an artillery bombardment at 07:30, followed by a maneuver against the loyalists' left flank at 09:00. The rebels tried to lure the enemy into the more open region of Prado, but the brigades remained in their positions. Another attack was attempted on the right flank, and again the loyalists managed to reinforce the attacked point and hold the line. According to the Brigade's report, "the situation of the loyalist lines was not changed during the entire action, as the opponent remained on the defensive until the end".

Without one of its squadrons, the 1st RC had only 306 men in Santa Maria, of which around 200 fought, with the rest providing auxiliary services. The loyalist command requested reinforcements by telegraph and was able to receive them by train; civilians committed to the revolt should have cut railway communications, but they did not. The result was small, as the only reinforcement that day was from the Cachoeira do Sul Auxiliary Squadron, with 69 men. They disembarked at 18:00 when the Railway Station was under attack. Additional reinforcements, the 18th and 27th Auxiliary Corps, only arrived after the end of the battle. The number on the other side of the trenches, depending on the sources, ranged from 350 to 700–800 rebels. The army units had reduced numbers, and the 7th RI did not have its second battalion, which was deployed in Rio Pardo. Both sides relied on civilian support.

The qualitative advantage belonged to the loyalists, as the 1st RC was an admittedly fierce unit, while the army troops were at the beginning of their training period, and therefore of little military value. The rebels controlled twelve cannons, but only five were functional; the rest were sabotaged by loyalist sergeants. The artillery fired from the front of the 5th RAM, from the front and sides of the 7th RI and at the Rosário Church, on Silva Jardim Street, firing directly at the positions of the Military Brigade and aiming at the barracks of the 1st RC. The cloudy sky and intermittent drizzle made aiming difficult.

The 1st RC spent 78,590 rounds in the battle, guaranteed by a resupply and remuneration service. The military effort also included observatories at various points, emissaries on horseback (from the Command to the troops) and on foot (between the troops) and a health service at the Hospital de Caridade. Medical care for the rebels took place at the Army Military Hospital, under the direction of first lieutenant and doctor Romeu Borba and second lieutenant and veterinarian João Lemos. Both were loyalists, but ordered to work under armed surveillance. Several shots hit the hospital.

==== Withdrawal ====
Without dislodging the brigades from their positions, the rebels would have the option of leveling the city with artillery, which they did not want to, rejecting an imitation of the bombing of São Paulo in 1924. Continuing the impasse would leave the revolt isolated as soon as the loyalists received more reinforcements. The alternative found was to leave the city. The withdrawal began at 21:00, but part of the troops delayed until the next day, as a sergeant in charge of transmitting the order did not carry out his mission. (Note: "According to a report by 1st lieutenant Heitor Lobato Valle, also published in 1927 by the same newspaper, it was 3rd sergeant Brasiliano de Araújo, whose failure in the mission could have been motivated by death, cowardice or betrayal. Although the reason for the failure was uncertain, Heitor Valle assured that it had caused a delay in the withdrawal of some fractions of the rebel forces, giving the impression that there had been haste in the rebels' departure". (Santos 2016, p. 84).) At midnight, while the withdrawal was taking place, three cannons intensified their fire.

At 04:00, the rebels' fire was already very weakened and major Barão was informed of the withdrawal. He preferred caution, especially at daylight, and manned the access roads to his own barracks, fearing an enveloping movement by the enemy. The northern flank received the order to advance, but found the 5th RAM barracks empty and retreated, fearing an ambush. At 05:00, a loyalist army officer, imprisoned in the 7th RI barracks, sent a message to colonel Enéas, asking him to break into the jails, as the rebels abandoned the barracks taking the keys with them. After the prisoners were released, the colonel sent his aide-de-camp with a white flag down Niederauer Avenue, but he had to turn back after two blocks as he was fired upon, probably by remaining rebels.

On the orders of colonel Enéas, white flags were raised at the headquarters and an emissary was sent to major Barão. At 09:00 the Military Brigade launched a general advance. The only resistance encountered was in Vila Brasil. (Note: "The full name was Vila Operária Brasil, it consisted of fifty wooden houses and was located in the block delimited by the streets Venâncio Aires, Andradas, Barão do Triunfo and Visconde de Pelotas" (Santos 2016, p. 87).) The population took to the streets, and the 1st RC occupied the army barracks.

350 rebels left the city, heading towards São Sepé, 150 of them on horseback. They carried two cannons, useless for the type of war they faced, and three heavy machine guns. The retreat was disorderly, leaving behind weapons and equipment, including the two cannons. According to several newspapers, the houses along the way were looted. The loyalist soldiers were too exhausted to take advantage of the disorganization, and did not pursue their enemies outside the city, limiting themselves to launching some elements of exploration. On 20 November, according to the 5th Brigade bulletin, almost 200 rebels had returned to the barracks, and many others were hiding in the woods. On the 25th, 119 men from the 5th RAM were still absent.

==== Consequences ====
The battle cost the Military Brigade three deaths and 14 injuries, the rebels had six dead and 22 injured, and the civilian population four deaths and 12 injuries. The number of wounded rebels and civilians may have been higher, as some wounded rebels were taken by their comrades in retreat, and not all civilians sought care at the Charity Hospital.

66 buildings were damaged by artillery, including several residences, the Clube Caixeiral, Colégio Elementar, Agência Ford, Ginásio Santa Maria and Seminário São José, the latter two, with students at the time of the bombing. According to the newspaper Correio da Serra,

Ipiranga Avenue was the street that suffered most from the bombing. Captain Felipe's house, owned by Dr. Mario Guimarães, received two shells, which completely destroyed its roof, ruining part of the front; the Charity Hospital, in front of which a force from the Brigade was entrenched, received a large number of projectiles; the house occupied by the traveling salesman Mr. Antônio Basso, suffered horribly, being shattered by thousands of projectiles, with a shell piercing a wall, exploding in the room and rendering all the furniture in it useless, leaving the building almost completely destroyed; Mr. Maximiliano Danezi's house was hit by many projectiles; the one owned by Mr. Homero Beltrão received a shell that caused extensive damage.

Shootings and bombing paralyzed life in the city. Businesses closed and few dared to stay on the street. The population took refuge in basements, cellars and remote streets or fled on foot and in carts to the forests around the city and neighboring municipalities. Newspapers stopped circulating and the supply of meat and bread was interrupted for two days. The machine guns and cannons, in the words of Correio da Serra, "chopped, one could say, hundreds of electrical power cables and telephone wires". The Santa Maria Power Plant had its chimney hit by shells, and the city was left in darkness. Normalization took several days after the end of the conflict, leading to a series of robberies on nights without street lighting.

After the conflict ended, major Barão was promoted to lieutenant colonel. Notable people from local society raised funds for a tribute to the 1st Cavalry Regiment, which was criticized in the newspaper Gaspar Martins, according to which "some would say that they signed, either because someone was part of the committee asking for it, or because he didn't want to be looked down upon by the Brigade or by the Brigade's supporters". Borges de Medeiros prevented the tribute, according to him, as the regiment did nothing more than fulfill its duty; according to historian Romeu Beltrão, the governor did not want to antagonize the army. Opponents of the municipal government were accused of collaborating with the revolt, including Arnaldo de Mello, editor-in-chief of Correio da Serra.

== The battle of Seival ==
=== Movements after Santa Maria ===
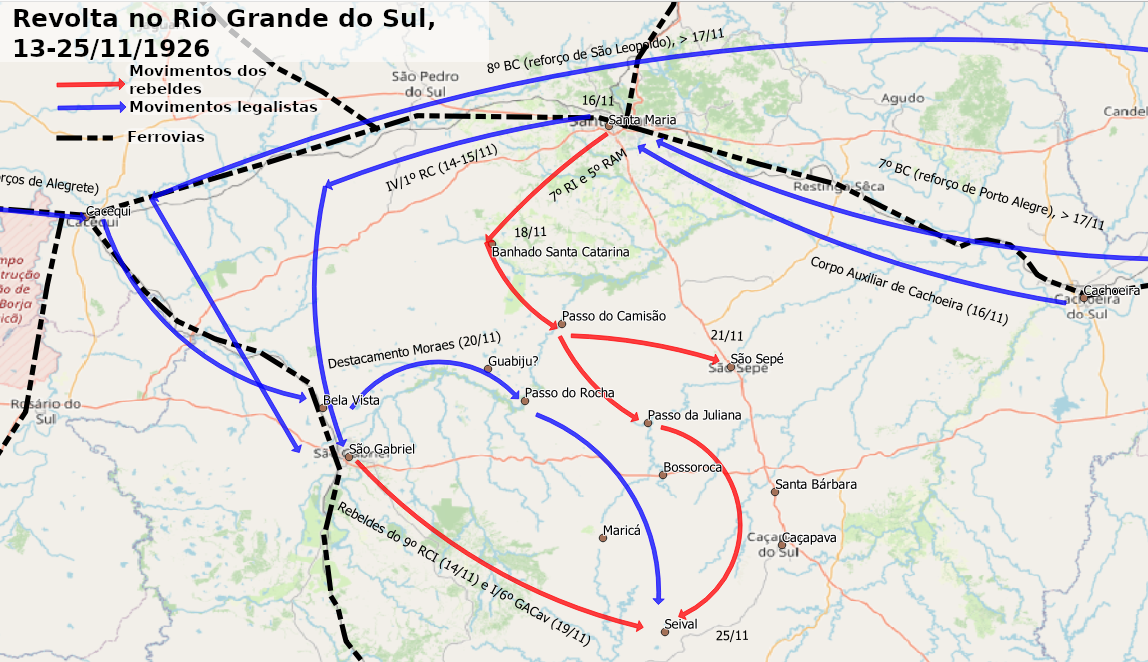
Loyalist and rebel maneuvers in mid-November

After the revolt in Santa Maria, general Eurico de Andrade Neves, commander of the 3rd Military Region, accelerated the loyalist mobilization. The 7th Hunter Battalion (BC), from Porto Alegre, was transferred to Santa Maria, and the 8th BC, from São Leopoldo, to São Gabriel. The railway junction in Cacequi was occupied by an army contingent, coming from the São Simão Remount Depot. The state government continued to mobilize volunteers and on 23 November created four provisional corps in Santa Maria, Cachoeira, Rio Pardo and Palmeira, with 261 men. At the beginning of the following month, the 16th Auxiliary Corps, or "Railway Battalion", was also created to defend the railway.

The rebels from Santa Maria entered the municipality of São Gabriel on 18 November. Their marshals, looking for horses, shot at civilians, and the news reached the loyalists. The city was occupied by the 8th BC and the IV/1st RC, and spies in the barracks watched suspicious officers. This was not enough to prevent the troops from joining the rebels. On the 19th, lieutenant Vicente Mário de Castro rebelled 38 soldiers from the 1st Battery of the 6th Horse Artillery Group (I/6th GACav). Instead of revolting in the city, they escaped to join their companions from Santa Maria, heading to Seival, in Caçapava. Moments after the withdrawal, the 8th BC surrounded the barracks.

A mixed detachment of the army and Military Brigade, led by major Luiz Carlos de Moraes, was tasked with pursuing the Santa Maria rebels. It was made up of 50 soldiers from the Remount Depot, the IV/1st RC, which was still in São Gabriel, and two formations from Alegrete, the 6th RCI and the "Patriot Corps". The 6th RCI was full of supporters of the revolt, so that major Moraes used only 140 men. The 522 irregulars of the Patriot Corps, in the major's opinion, were "poorly organized, without uniforms and equipment, but with a lot of enthusiasm, which was transmitted to them by the personality of their leader", the quartermaster of Alegrete, Oswaldo Aranha. In total, the detachment had 800 men, concentrating at the Bela Vista railway station (Note: Later Tiaraju station.) on 20 November.

The IV/1st RC was sent further ahead to Passo da Rocha, near the Vacacaí river, where the Santa Maria rebels had been spotted. These crossed the river at Passo do Camisão, entering the municipality of São Sepé. A detachment was sent to headquarters to disable communications; the place was protected by a small contingent of the Military Brigade, which left the city, avoiding combat. The bulk of the rebels continued to Passo da Juliana, in the São Sepé stream, to reach the municipality of Caçapava. The loyalist detachment stationed in Guabiju, where it was overtaken by a rebel deserter who reported the enemy's strength, weapons and ammunition.

Major Moraes then decided to send two reconnaissance elements to the front, with the mission of pinning down the enemy until the bulk of the detachment arrived. Aware of automatic weapons, he ordered these elements to avoid a full engagement. Each would have 200 men, largely from the Patriot Corps. One would head in the direction of Caçapava, commanded by Oswaldo Aranha, and the other in the direction of São Sepé under one of his trusted men, major Laurindo Ramos. Both were to maintain contact with the detachment, whose axis of movement would be in the direction of Santa Bárbara and Bossoroca. However, the vanguards demonstrated operational indiscipline, maintaining little contact and incorporating the detachment's emissaries. Oswaldo Aranha, without the knowledge and authorization of major Moraes, also incorporated the entire IV/1st RC into his element.

=== Field battle ===
The rebels from São Gabriel were welcomed at Favorino Dias' estancia, in Seival, where the sergeants from the 9th RCI were already there. This rancher armed and equipped 70 supporters and family members on his own and sent cowboys to establish contact with the Santa Maria rebels, which they achieved on 23 November. The following day, when they were camping at Passo do Seival, close to joining their companions, they were found by the force of major Laurindo Ramos.

The terrain was too open for fighting, and the rebels only took a delaying action as they left the scene. Some army soldiers died, but the combat itself was of little relevance. Oswaldo Aranha heard about what happened and underestimated his opponent. He joined his forces with those of Laurindo Ramos and sent a note to major Moraes: "he had reached the rebels in full disbandment and thought the revolt was over; it was a simple police case, not involving military operations".

On the night of 24 November, the rebels, comprising a total of 400 civilians and soldiers, positioned themselves on a rocky elevation above the Seival floodplain, with excellent control of the terrain. Two Hotchkiss machine guns were located at the ends of the troops' center, and one more in reserve. Favorino Dias assumed general command, while tactical command fell to lieutenant Alcides Etchegoyen. A network of double sentries kept command informed. Oswaldo Aranha was with the vanguard (around 500 men) in the abandoned camp at Passo do Seival. He decided to attack immediately, without waiting for the rest of the detachment, which was still in Maricá.

Around 5:00, the loyalists appeared in the Seival floodplain, advancing in drill order, without in-depth reconnaissance or flank security. As they got closer, they were met by machine gun fire. The regular component of the loyalists (coming from the IV/1st RC and 6th RCI) took a position on foot in a ravine between the floodplain and the elevation. From there, they supported the horse charges of the other attackers with their machine guns. The attacks against the flanks, with shouts of "fire the machine gun!" and "behead the Bahians!", were suicidal, with some attackers dying almost in line with the defenders.

One of the charges captured the left flank of the defense, a stony spur defended by elements of the 5th RAM. More and more attackers entered the gap, threatening the center of defense, occupied by the 7th RI and 5th RAM. Lieutenant Vicente and the I/6th GACav came from the rear and managed to close the gap. From the gully stream, two platoons of the IV/1st RC attempted to advance, but suffered heavy casualties.

After five hours of fighting, ammunition was running out and the attackers were losing heart. Oswaldo Aranha personally led a charge to the left flank, but was wounded by a rifle bullet and his troops were demoralized. According to the testimony of one of his sons, Euclydes Gudolle Aranha Neto:

He [Oswaldo Aranha] lost one, two, three horses... in the fourth the bullet hit his foot and pierced the horse's belly... he continued to command... he put the machine gun in... they lassoed... they lassoed the machine gun ... and when dad [Oswaldo Aranha] fell bloodless, they then withdrew, with relative difficulty...

Major Laurindo Ramos, also injured, ordered the retreat. The rebels could not pursue him far, as they were also exhausted and needed to help their wounded. Major Moraes tried to gather the detachment for a counterattack, but there were no conditions. He was down to just over 400 men. The defeat cost him more than 100 casualties.

== Incursions in Rio Grande do Sul ==
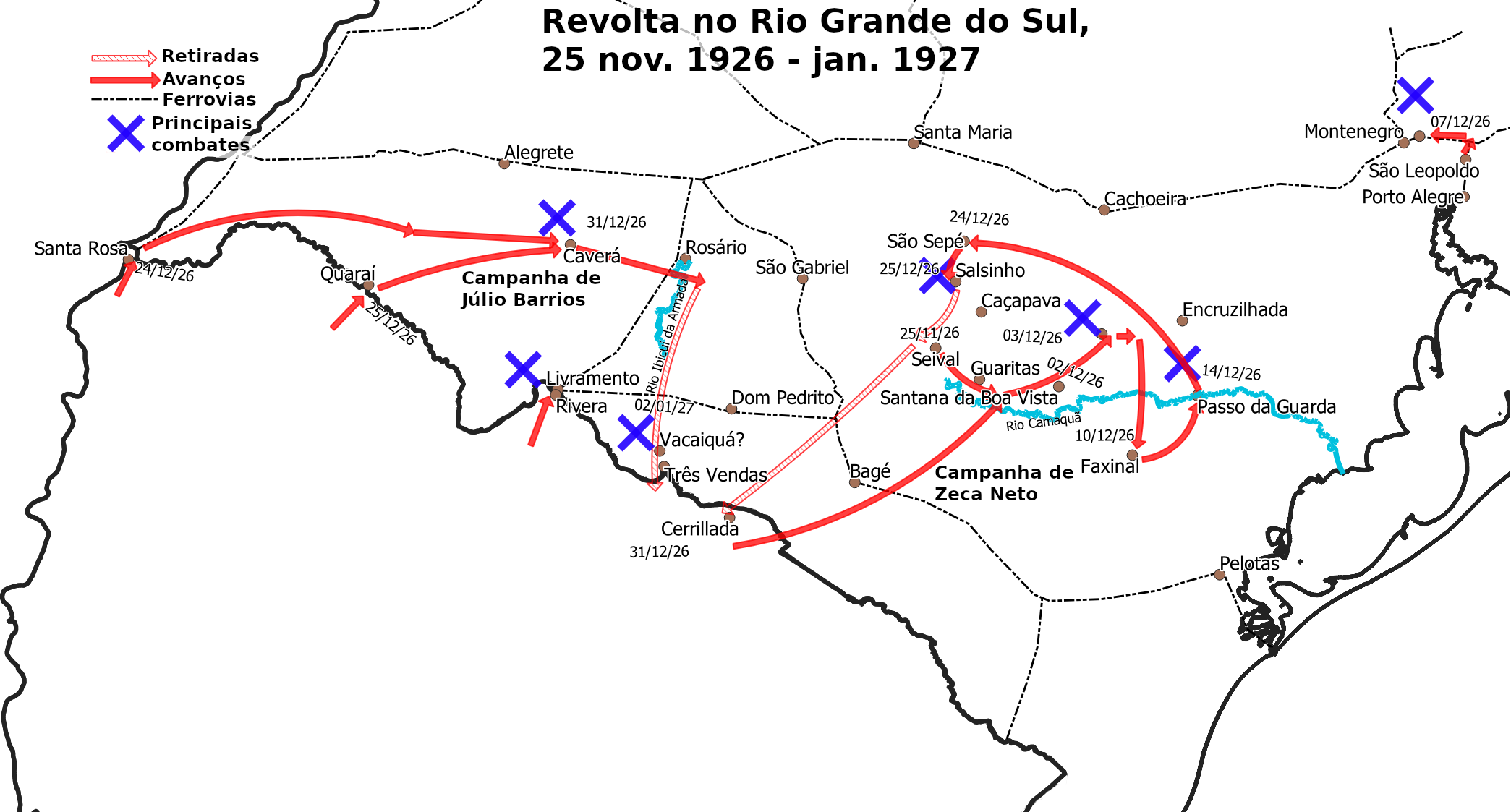
Campaigns of São Leopoldo, Zeca Neto and Júlio Barrios

The day after the battle, the Police Headquarters banned news relating to the "seditious movement". The government was forced into greater mobilization, and the rebels gained new enthusiasm and support. Zeca Neto came from Uruguay and took command of the column, with which he traveled around the Serras do Sudeste, Central Depression and Campanha, distracting and tiring the loyalists and giving time for new revolts. A 75-year-old veteran guerrilla fighter, Zeca Neto did not obey the principles of the war academies, but he had extensive knowledge of the terrain. In Uruguay, Isidoro continued to organize new columns in support of Zeca Neto.

At the beginning of December, loyalist detachments of lieutenant colonel Emílio Lúcio Esteves, lieutenant colonel Hipólito Ribeiro Júnior, major Moraes, major Otacílio Fernandes and other minors were operating in the central region. Only Esteves and Moraes acted in coordination, with the others simply following the enemy's trail. The Moraes detachment was reinforced with the 21st and 26th CAs to compensate for desertions and losses in Seival. The experience of the 21st stood out, which had already fought the Prestes Column in Northeastern Brazil. The other detachments were new: the Esteves detachment was organized in Cachoeira on 6 December, (Note: Composed of the 1st RC (minus one squadron), 15th CA and a machine gun platoon (Ribeiro 1953, p. 479).) and the Hipólito detachment on 13 December. (Note: Composed of the 9th, 10th and 13th CAs (Ribeiro 1953, p. 490).)

Another revolt in the army occurred in the early hours of 7 December. A detachment of 40 soldiers from the 7th RI, stationed in São Leopoldo, rose up, took possession of weapons and went by train towards Montenegro, but had to stop at the Pareci station, as the superior management of Viação Férrea ordered the overturn of a locomotive on the way. On the same day, the rebels were found and arrested, after a brief shootout, by a wing of the 3rd Infantry Battalion of the Military Brigade.

=== Zeca Neto's campaign ===
Crossing the border in the municipality of Bagé, Zeca Neto joined the Seival rebels on the Camaquã River, in the region between Guaritas and Santana da Boa Vista. The unified column numbered about 700 men. (Note: Caggiani 1997, p. 32. Aragão 2021, p. 232, citing Fernando Távora, specifies an invasion on 25 November, but also states that Júlio Barrios invaded the following day, which does not match with Caggiani 1997 and Ribeiro 1953. According to the official note from the 3rd RM, Zeca Neto crossed the Velhaco stream valley before joining the other rebels (Ribeiro 1953, p. 493); the 21st CA recorded a shootout between its patrols and Zeca Neto's rear guard in Santana on 2 December (Ribeiro 1953, p. 469).) His constant mobility prevented a decisive clash, generating complaints from the command of the 3rd Military Region to lieutenant colonel Esteves. In the first few weeks, there were only small meetings with Auxiliary Corps. (Note: Cabeda 2008, p. 331. Ribeiro 1953 describes fighting with the Moraes detachment, at the tips of Piquiri, on the 3rd (p. 461-462); with the 12th CA in Faxinal, Canguçu, on the 10th (p. 471), and with the 4th CA in the municipality of Caçapava, on December 18 (p. 472).)

The rebels headed towards the municipality of Encruzilhada, where they clashed with the Morais detachment and headed south, crossing the Camaquã at Passo da Restinga. In the south, they encountered the Hipólito detachment and had to march east, where they crossed the river at Passo da Guarda. The 21st CA attacked the column during the transposition on 14 December. In the confusion, "army lieutenant Helen Salvaterra, a caudilhete named Medina and 9 other rebels then drowned". Lieutenant Salvaterra, a member of Isidoro's General Staff, was the biggest loss so far.

Back on the north bank of the Camaquã, the rebels headed west. On Christmas Eve, they passed through São Sepé, where they beheaded captain Manoel Cristóvão Gomes, the local police chief. Such violence occurred on other occasions in the campaign, usually for personal reasons, and without the knowledge or interference of army officers. Increasingly closer, the Esteves detachment was already approaching the west of the city, camping on the night of the 24th over the Juliana pass. The Otacílio detachment was also nearby.

Parts of the Esteves detachment and Zeca Neto's column had their first meeting at Passo do Salsinho, at 09:00 on Christmas. The rebels avoided combat and continued their retreat south, west of Caçapava. Loyalist pressure forced them to take over three defensive lines, which were defeated by flanking maneuvers. The last one, at the top of the Santa Bárbara mountain range, fell at 15:00. The rebels fled in rout, and the loyalist pursuit continued until reaching the tips of Seival the following day. Vicente Mário de Castro, one of the lieutenants, witnessed the beheading of several sailors from the battleship São Paulo, prisoners of the loyalists.

Zeca Neto's column spent almost all its ammunition in the fight at São Sepé. With no prospect of support, the rebels divided into smaller groups and headed to the municipality of Bagé, on their way to Uruguay. Lieutenant colonel Esteves returned to Porto Alegre, leaving the pursuit to the Auxiliary Corps. On 31 December the rebels crossed the border at Cerrillada. Later, their pursuers found the weapons hidden in caves before the border, as the rebels did not want to hand them over to the Uruguayans.

=== Júlio Barrios' campaign ===
In order to help Zeca Neto's column, Isidoro continued to prepare raids with the exiles in Uruguay. According to the plan, drawn up by Fernando Távora, the general commander would be Júlio Barrios, supported by his chief of staff, Stênio Caio de Albuquerque Lima. This column would "break" the border in Quaraí and join two others, that of Newton Estillac Leal, (Note: Subdivided into three. The first group was "Virgílio Viana, a respected local political leader, and his nephew Gonçalves Viana, a fearless fighter in the South", but Virgílio Viana did not participate personally. The second group, which included Estillac Leal, included Thales Marcondes, Alcides Araújo, Augusto do Amaral Peixoto and sailors from São Paulo. The third group was an independent platoon organized and financed by the brothers Pedro, Floriano and Setembrino Palma (Aragão 2021, p. 227-228).) coming from Santa Rosa (Bella Unión), and that of Adalberto Correia, (Note: Otávio's brother, the civilian who joined the Copacabana Fort revolt in 1922. His group, the only one with machine guns, included Hercolino Cascardo, Renato Tavares da Cunha Melo, "survivor of the battle of Alegrete", and the warlord Panta Trindade (Aragão 2021, p. 227-228).) the best armed one, coming from Rivera. Then, a fourth group would revolt Santana do Livramento. (Note: "There Jairo Jair de Albuquerque Lima was already developing great conspiratorial activity, together with his colleagues in arms. It was made up of: Riograndino Kruel (Amaury Kruel's brother), Canrobert, Rui Zubaran, Bráulio Gouveia and the navy officers who had arrived from Montevideo" (Aragão 2021, p. 227-228).) The Santa Rosa detachment crossed the border on 24 December, and the Quaraí detachment the following day, unaware of Zeca Neto's defeat.

According to Alegrete's intendant, there were 200 rebels. The loyalist response came from several directions. Major Luiz Aranha, eager to avenge his brother's injury, led his provisional troops from Alegrete. Flores da Cunha mobilized the Livramento provisional troops. In Dom Pedrito, the 21st CA and the 2nd RC of the Military Brigade concentrated on 30 December.

When it was about to join the Santa Rosa group, the Quaraí group was intercepted by Luiz Aranha's provisional forces. Stênio organized a defense and a local cow herder guided them away, but 22 of the 44 men fell or were arrested, and Júlio de Barrios himself barely survived, leaving Stênio in command. After the union with Estillac, they went to the Três Cerros estancia, in Caverá, where they hoped to find Adalberto. However, the Rivera column was unable to fulfill its role, as it was blocked by loyalist resistance just at the border.

On 31 December, at lunchtime, the rebels were again overtaken by a large loyalist force. Suffering casualties, they were pursued to the Ibicuí da Armada River. Flores da Cunha's provisional troops were already approaching. After crossing the river towards Dom Pedrito, 50 men from the Rosário garrison reinforced their pursuers. The soldiers were already exhausted, and the offensive was futile. On 2 January, the 1st Squadron of the 2nd RC defeated them at Passo do Vacaiquá and they fought in retreat until Três Vendas, where they emigrated.

The column still tried to return to Rivera without approaching the border and encountered its companions from Adalberto's group. There was another offensive, without effect. All that could be done was to treat the wounded at Rivera.

== Leonel Rocha's campaign ==
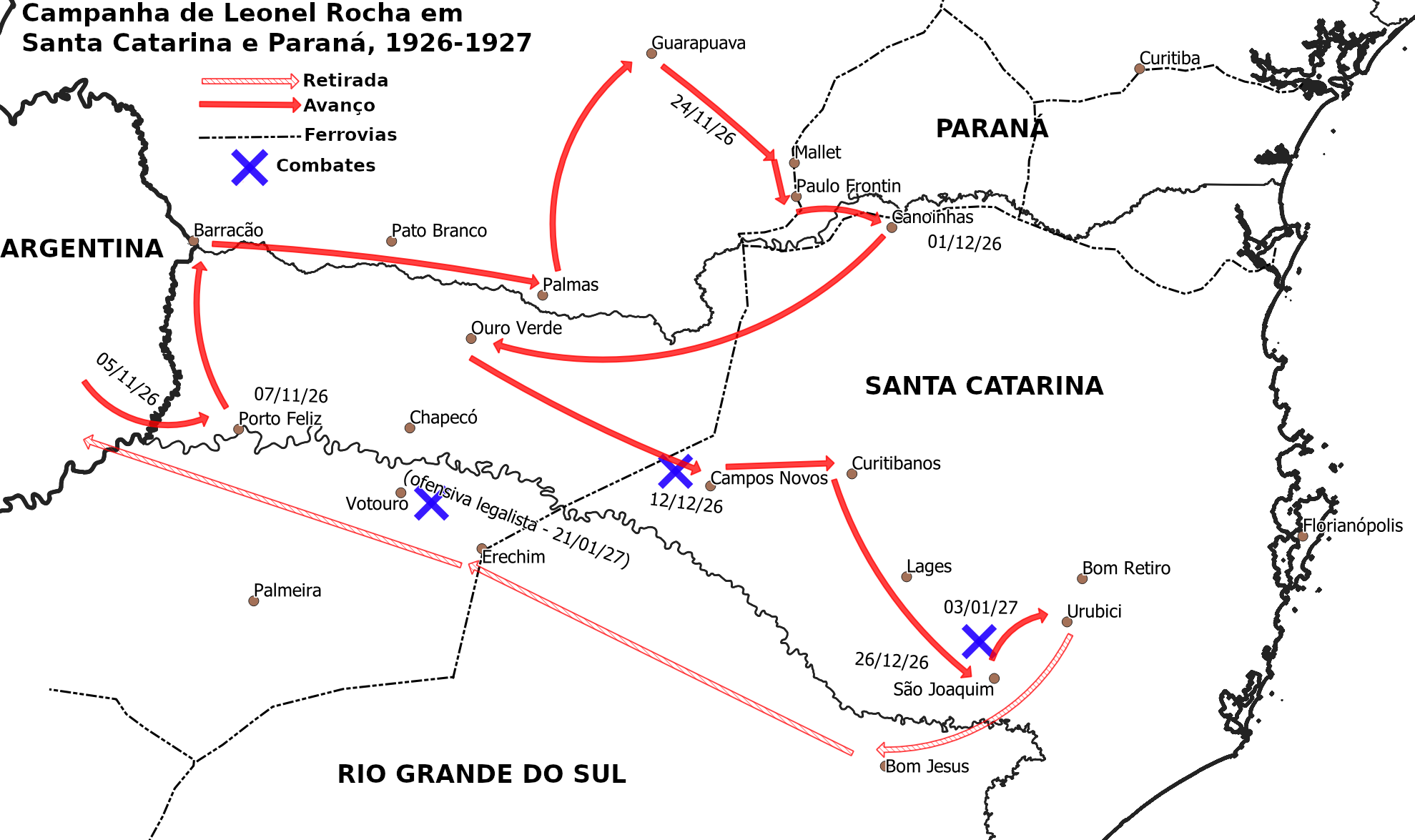
Leonel Rocha's itinerary to and from exile

In the campaign plan, the attack on the São Paulo-Rio Grande Railway would begin with an incursion by warlords Leonel Rocha and Fidêncio de Mello, coming from Argentina. Fidêncio de Mello had some prestige in the Contestado region, which would be crossed. Veteran revolutionaries would come from the Missões region. Leonel Rocha, acting in an undisciplined manner, crossed the Peperi-Guaçu river earlier and, consequently, only two of the veterans (Simas Enéias and Deusdit Augusto de Loyola) joined the column. (Note: The others would be Olympio Falconière da Cunha, Agenor Braynner, César Bachi and Magalhães Barata (Aragão 2021, p. 225-226).)

This column had 80–100 to just over 200 men, (Note: Number given by Meirelles 2002. Cabral 1937, without giving numbers, mentions a large increase in personnel after passing through Paraná.) well-mounted and armed, including with Bergmann machine guns, acquired in Buenos Aires. They were not, however, in the terrain to which their leader was accustomed, the Palmeira forests. Looking for horses, weapons and various items, on 7 December the troops surrounded the town of Porto Feliz (currently Mondaí), Santa Catarina. The settlers' self-defense troops attacked the invaders with locally made hand grenades, but were unsuccessful.

Leonel Rocha continued to Paraná via Barracão, from where he went to Pato Branco (where he faced an army detachment) and Palmas, joining Simas Enéias' group. From there, according to an official note from the Presidency of the Republic, the column invaded the city of Guarapuava and withdrew on the 24th, as the loyalists approached. The rebels finally reached the railway, attacking the Mallet and Paulo Frontin stations, but under pursuit, they returned to Santa Catarina, via Canoinhas, on 1 December.

The loyalist persecution in Santa Catarina was led by colonel Eliziario Paim, commanding the 13th and 14th BCs, an infantry regiment from Curitiba, the 9th Machine Gun Company, the Public Force of Santa Catarina and the 2nd Battalion of the Public Force of São Paulo. Leonel Rocha's next objective was Campos Novos, where he was defeated on 12 December. (Note: As for the itinerary, Aragão 2021 states that it first passed through Canoinhas and Curitibanos, while Cabral 1937 lists Ouro Verde and Curitibanos. Ribeiro 1953 simply mentions a movement by Canoinhas towards the Santa Catarina–Rio Grande do Sul border.) From there, he headed east and passed through São Joaquim on the 26th. According to a local report, there were around 180 rebels. Four days later, 200 police officers from Santa Catarina arrived in the town.

On 3 January, colonel Paim defeated the rebels on Cedro Hill, near São Joaquim. There were no deaths, but the column left behind some of its supplies and cavalry, and several of its officers were taken prisoner. The rebels advanced against Bom Retiro, but were repelled along the way, fighting in Urubici. There were only 15 men left in Leonel Rocha's column. Returning to Rio Grande do Sul via Bom Jesus, the commander passed through Erechim and crossed the Uruguay River into exile in Argentina.

On 21 January, a group of Auxiliary Corps (3rd, 6th, 18th, 26th and a wing of the 30th) began a loyalist offensive in the Erechim region. They were commanded by lieutenant colonel João de Deus Canabarro Cunha, assigned to this mission by the command of the 3rd Military Region. According to this commander, "the rebels, in large groups of 600 men, more or less, were located in the region of the Tapir lake, Douradinho river, Votouro, with advances in different directions". The narrative by Aldo Ladeira Ribeiro, a historian of the Military Brigade, does not mention or associate these groups with Leonel Rocha.

After some fighting, until the 30th resistance became weak, and from then on there was only persecution of refugees. From the Military Brigade's point of view, "with these operations, the unpatriotic revolutionary movement that, in July 1924, had broken out in the capital of the great Bandeirante State [São Paulo] came to a complete end".

== Consequences ==
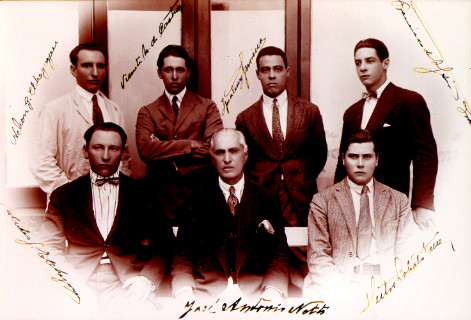
Zeca Neto with the rebellious lieutenants of 1926

Most of the defeated rebels took refuge in Uruguay. Since 1 January 1927, a new border treaty with Brazil was in force, by which the leaders of the rebellions in Brazil would be interned in this country as far as possible from the Brazilian border. The soldiers remained in concentration camps close to the border, such as in Tacuarembó, where 297 rebels were interned. There was no new chance; the 1926 tenentist uprising was the final one.

Due to its ephemeral nature, the movement was nicknamed "Lightning Column"; in historiography there is also the plural, "lightning columns". The nickname was a reference to the campaign of Herrera, a Uruguayan political leader from the Blanco Party. Boarding a "lightning train", he stopped at each station just long enough to utter a few brief words.

The Rio Grande do Sul campaign reached its peak in Seival. This combat is notorious in Brazilian military history as the end of the "gaucho style war" and the cavalry charges. For Flávio Poitevin, the event was "the last gaucho cavalry charge initiated with the southern Guaicurus, at the end of 1500". In Santa Catarina, the campaign had "few consequences", according to Oswaldo Cabral, a historian of that state. Paulo Adam noted the "epic" dimension of Leonel Rocha's journey.
