= Rio Grande do Sul Revolt of 1925 =

- Part of Tenentism
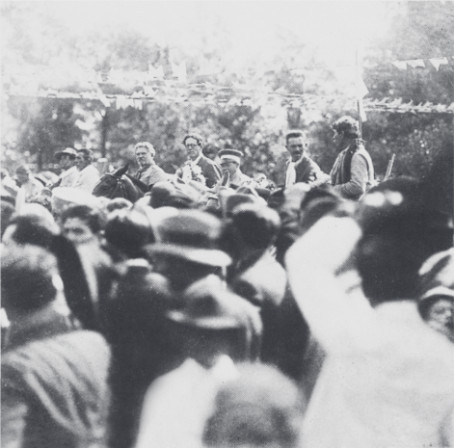
- Oswaldo Aranha's irregular troops passing through Alegrete after victory
Date	29 September – 8 October 1925 (in Brazil); 21–24 September 1925 (in Uruguay)
Location	Rio Grande do Sul, Brazil and Uruguay
Result	Loyalist victory

Belligerents
Rebels: Liberating Alliance; Tenentist rebels	Brazil: Brazilian Army; Military Brigade; Uruguay

Commanders and leaders
Isidoro Dias Lopes; Honório Lemes; Adalberto Corrêa	Borges de Medeiros; Flores da Cunha

The Rio Grande do Sul Revolt of 1925, also called Revolution of 1925, was triggered by opposition civilians, supported by tenentists, aiming to overthrow the state government of the Brazilian state of Rio Grande do Sul and support the Prestes Column. The revolt was planned by exiles, defeated in the previous 1924 revolt, who still recognized the leadership of general Isidoro Dias Lopes. The plan envisaged uprisings in the army and invasions across the border by groups of exiles.

However, the expected uprisings did not occur and only one of the leaders of the incursions, Honório Lemes, crossed the border at the end of September. Several groups operated in the municipalities of Santana do Livramento and Dom Pedrito until their surrender or exile in early October. Another leader, Adalberto Corrêa, also tried to cross the border, but was intercepted, injured and arrested by the Uruguayan Army and police before even entering Brazil.

== Background ==
The armed conflict between the Riograndense Republican Party (PRR) and the opposition to its political dominance in Rio Grande do Sul, apparently ended in the 1923 Revolution, was renewed in a new revolt in 1924. The dispute for state power mixed with tenentism, a military movement with national ambitions, whose enemy was Artur Bernardes, president of Brazil. The civilian oppositionists of the Liberating Alliance, led by Assis Brasil, allied themselves with rebellious military personnel, who respected the authority of general Isidoro Dias Lopes. Loyalists defended the state and federal governments. The revolt was defeated, and its participants took two paths: some continued the armed struggle outside the state, in the Prestes Column. Others went into exile in neighboring countries, such as Argentina and Uruguay.

While their companions were still fighting in the Prestes Column, the exiles continued with several revolutionary attempts, little explored in literature. The scarcity of resources, police surveillance and diplomatic pressure did not prevent Isidoro from plotting a new armed, civil-military uprising in Rio Grande do Sul, in order to divide the government's attention. For civilians, the priority was to depose the state ruler, Borges de Medeiros.

== Campaign ==
The plan drawn up by the exiles envisaged civilians crossing the border and uprisings in the army garrisons in that region, such as the 5th Independent Cavalry Regiment (RCI), from Uruguaiana. According to Anacleto Firpo, a friend of Assis Brasil, civilians would wait for the military uprising to take action. On the other hand, according to Adalberto Corrêa, the uprising was "mainly civilian and was articulated independently of military movements". Adalberto and his exiles would invade through Santa Vitória do Palmar, which they believed was poorly defended. Zeca Neto would come via the Jaguarão River, Honório Lemes via Coxilha Negra, Júlio Barrios via Quaraí, Virgílio Viana via Barra do Quaraí and Leonel Rocha via Alto Uruguai.

Pressure from the Uruguayan authorities induced Adalberto Corrêa and Honório Lemes to bring forward the plan, taking action on their own at the end of September. In the case of Honório Lemes, he was also attracted by the promise of support from an officer from the São Gabriel garrison. Honório's offensive, consisting exclusively of civilians, found itself isolated. The conspirators in the 5th RCI did not fulfill their promise, according to them, due to the transfer of sergeants they were counting on. Zeca Neto, with health problems, had not yet taken action when he learned of Honório Lemes' defeat and abandoned the plan.

=== Adalberto Corrêa ===
Before crossing the border into Brazilian territory, the Santa Vitória do Palmar invasion force passed through a region heavily garrisoned by the Uruguayan Army and police, where it was detected. On 21 September, the Maldonado Police Department, suspecting trucks transporting agricultural machinery to the city of Rocha, seized the vehicles, in which they discovered 28 undeclared coffins with gunpowder and ammunition. Some of the trucks escaped, but the authorities were warned and the 18th Infantry Battalion went looking for them. The following day, eleven rebels fired at Chuy's deputy commander, but were imprisoned.

In the town of Castillos, Adalberto Corrêa's convoy was stopped by the police on the way to Brazil. Leading 40 men, Adalberto refused to hand over his weapons, and the police commissioner retreated as he had few men. On the 24th, reinforcements from the Uruguayan police and army engaged in intense firefights with several groups of rebels. Adalberto Corrêa was caught five kilometers from the border, accompanied by ten men. The brief fighting resulted in one Uruguayan soldier and two rebels being injured, including Adalberto himself.

The Uruguayans took prisoners and confiscated weapons and ammunition; According to Aldo Ladeira Ribeiro, a historian of the Military Brigade of Rio Grande do Sul, "there is no doubt that the materiel that Adalberto Corrêa intended to bring to Brazil would give some encouragement to his already demoralized fellow adventurers". Adalberto's final group of eleven men alone had ten boxes of ammunition, 50,000 rounds and 16 machine guns.

=== Honório Lemes ===
On the night of 29 to 30 September, other groups, numbering less than 500 men, crossed the border in the municipalities of Santana do Livramento and Dom Pedrito, under the leadership of "general' Honório Lemes. With around 100 men, the general's group entered Marco Araújo, in Livramento, a municipality repeatedly visited in attacks and escapes in previous conflicts. In the same municipality, Octacílio Rosa invaded through Marco do Lopes, and Fulgêncio dos Santos, through Galpões. In Dom Pedrito, the incursion was led by Octaviano Fernandes and Dinarte Gil Oliveira. The invasion force was exclusively civilian. Their horsmen, armed with revolvers, rifles, swords, and spears, were easily identifiable:

They were all wearing plaid shirts, baggy pants, black accordion boots, a high-crowned, wide-brimmed hat, from which hung a long, wide red ribbon, which fell over their shoulders like a kind of pennant, but which in fact constituted a badge. The red scarf and ribbon of the same color were the symbol of the revolution.

Honório Lemes' first attack was against the railway line between Porteirinhas and Santa Rita stations. After detaining a passenger train, the rebels tried to arrest a freight train, but the driver retreated to Livramento, under fire. A squadron from the 2nd Cavalry Regiment of the Military Brigade, from Livramento, continued to the railway line. The rebels had torn up tracks, burned wagons and destroyed the Porteirinhas station. Leaving the place, they confiscated the horses and forcibly recruited the men they found on the way.

The column continued to the Caverá region, where Honório, a veteran of 1923, always sought shelter after foraying into neighboring lands. On 3 October, the commander's group camped at Antônio Guerra's estancia, where they awaited the arrival of Dom Pedrito's group. The group, however, was under pursuit by the 21st Auxiliary Corps (AC). After two battles, Curral de Pedras (5 October) and Cerrilhada (8 October), Dom Pedrito's rebels returned to Uruguay.

In response to the incursions, the 3rd Military Region of the Brazilian Army organized a light column with civilian elements from Alegrete, Uruguaiana and Itaqui, the latter commanded by Oswaldo Aranha, elements from the army and the 4th Horse Infantry Battalion of the Military Brigade. Under the command of Flores da Cunha, this detachment encountered and pursued the rebels. On 7 October, the loyalist vanguard, made up of the Auxiliary Corps of Rosário, clashed with the advanced lines of Honório Lemes. Captain Pacheco, commander of the Auxiliary Corps, was wounded in combat and beheaded by the rebels.

The following day, Flores da Cunha's maneuvers pressed the rebel force between the Ibicuí da Cruz river — at that time, very full due to the rains — and Banhado das Marrecas. Realizing that he would be annihilated, Honório Lemes surrendered after negotiating the guarantee of his life and that of his men. Oswaldo Aranha witnessed the moment:

We were four hundred yards from the enemy; Dr. Flores in front of the 1st line; I [was] in a protective column, when we saw a white flag. It was an emotional scene. The revolutionaries advanced with their heads down, weapons in their hands pointed at the ground while others, without our interference, fled into the bush, throwing themselves into the Ibicuí River.

The part of the column that did not surrender crossed the river at Passo da Conceição, where around twenty men drowned.

== Consequences ==
The defeat did not discourage general Isidoro, who planned a new uprising, launched in 1926. However, Honório Lemes did not participate. The 1925 uprising would be his last combat, after which he was imprisoned in Porto Alegre until 1927. The government attributed the revolt to "professional rebels" based on the Uruguayan border. A new border treaty was later signed between Brazil and Uruguay, which committed to interning Brazilian rebel leaders as far from the border as possible. The agreement came into force in 1927, in time to be applied to the 1926 uprising.
