= Paulo Frontin =

Coordinates: 26°02′S 50°51′W

- Municipality
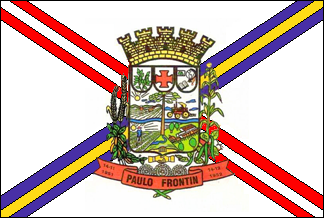
- Flag
- Interactive map of Paulo Frontin
- Country: Brazil
- Region: Southern
- State: Paraná
- Mesoregion: Sudeste Paranaense

Population (2020)
  - Total: 7,387
- Time zone: UTC−3 (BRT)

Paulo Frontin is a municipality in the state of Paraná in the Southern Region of Brazil.

== See also ==
- List of municipalities in Paraná
