= Cacequi =

Municipality of Rio Grande do Sul, Brazil

- Municipality
- Flag Coat of arms

- Location within Rio Grande do Sul

- Location in Brazil
- Coordinates: 29°53′S 54°49′W
- Country: Brazil
- State: Rio Grande do Sul
- Founded: 23 December 1944

Area
  - Total: 2,441 km^{2} (942 sq mi)
- Elevation: 103 m (338 ft)

Population (2022)
  - Total: 11,157
  - Density: 4.571/km^{2} (11.84/sq mi)
- Time zone: UTC−3 (BRT)

Cacequi is a municipality in the state of Rio Grande do Sul, Brazil, 407 km from Porto Alegre. As of 2020 its population was estimated at 12,423. The town is situated at an elevation of 103 m, with an area of 2,441 km^{2}, and is known as the capital of the watermelon.

== History ==
The town was emancipated on 23 December 1944. Its Patron Saint is Our Lady of Victory. Its name derives from the Tupi language: Cacequi, (bean's water) from cumandá, bean; í, water. Other definition say the name of the city means: indigenous chief water or indigenous chief River. The mayor of the city is Francisco Fonseca Franco.

== See also ==
- List of municipalities in Rio Grande do Sul
