= Barracão, Paraná =

Coordinates: 26°15′14″S 53°37′58″W

- Municipality
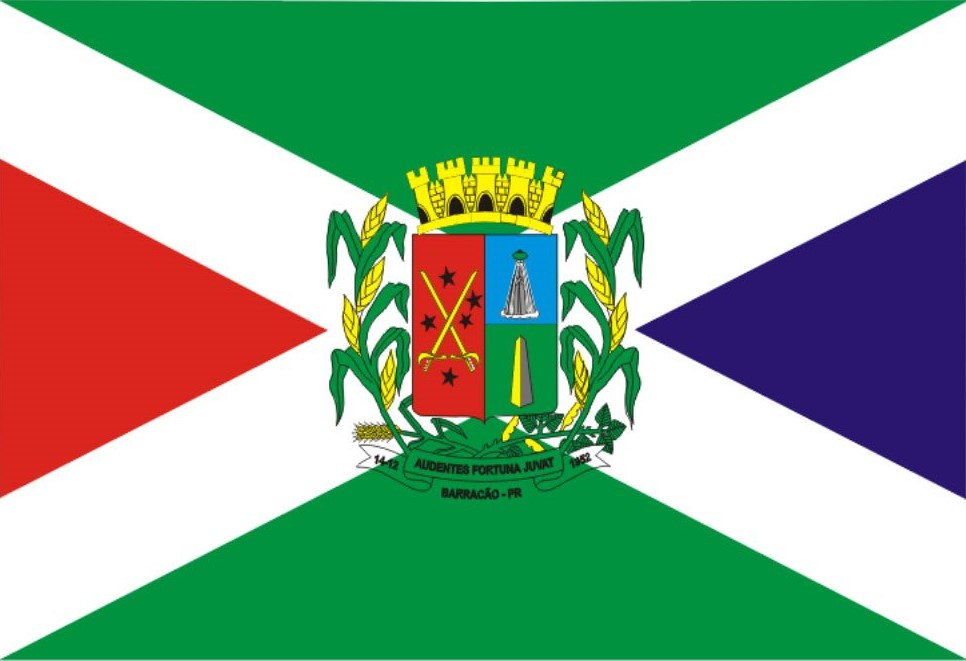
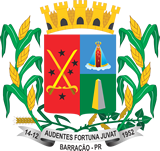
- Flag Coat of arms
- Interactive map of Barracão, Paraná
- Country: Brazil
- Region: Southern
- State: Paraná
- Mesoregion: Sudoeste Paranaense

Population (2020)
  - Total: 10,312
- Time zone: UTC−3 (BRT)

Barracão is a municipality in the state of Paraná in the Southern Region of Brazil. Barracão is part of a triple border with the state of Santa Catarina and the country of Argentina, with the border running through the middle of the municipality's urban center.

== See also ==
- List of municipalities in Paraná
