= Mondaí =

Coordinates: 27°05′S 53°25′W

- Municipality
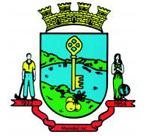
- Flag Coat of arms
- Interactive map of Mondaí
- Country: Brazil
- Region: South
- State: Santa Catarina
- Mesoregion: Oeste Catarinense

Population (2020)
  - Total: 11,889
- Time zone: UTC -3

Mondaí is a municipality in the state of Santa Catarina in the South region of Brazil.

== See also ==
- List of municipalities in Santa Catarina
