= Military Brigade of Rio Grande do Sul =

Brazilian reserve police of Rio Grande do Sul

Military Brigade of Rio Grande do Sul Brigada Militar do Rio Grande do Sul
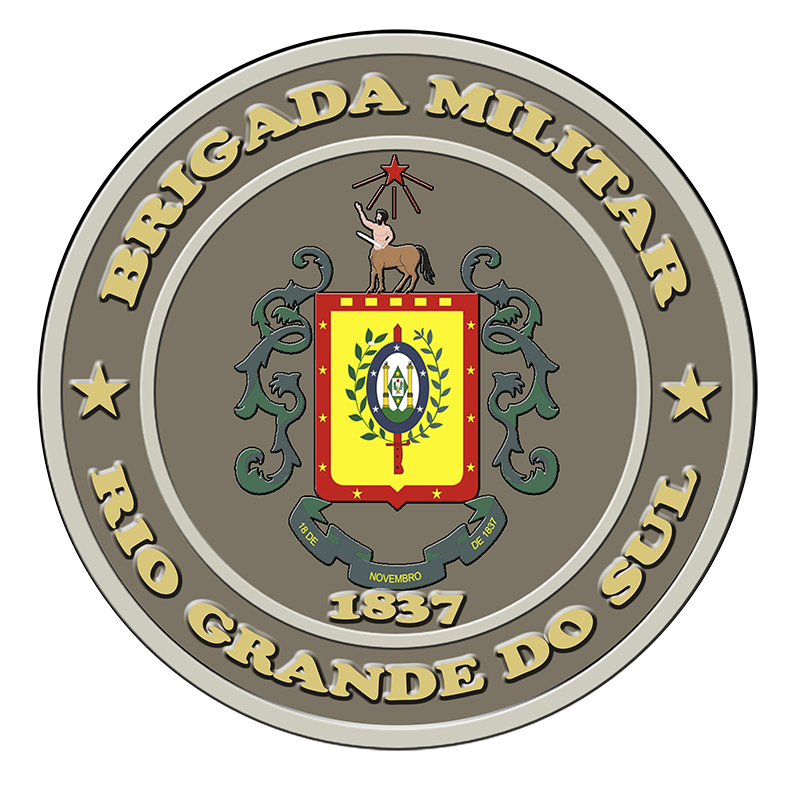
- Abbreviation: BMRS
- Motto: A força da comunidade The power of community

Agency overview
- Formed: November 18, 1837
- Employees: 26,500 sworn personnel

Jurisdictional structure
- Operations jurisdiction: Rio Grande do Sul, Brazil
- Map of police jurisdiction.
- Area: 43.696054 km^{2} (16.871141 sq mi)
- Population: 11,207,274 (2014)
- Constituting instrument: Article 42 of Constitution of Brazil
- General nature: Gendarmerie

Operational structure
- Headquarters: City of Porto Alegre

Website
- brigadamilitar.rs.gov.br

The Military Brigade of Rio Grande do Sul (Portuguese: Brigada Militar do Rio Grande do Sul, BMRS), like other military police in Brazil, is a reserve and auxiliary force of the Brazilian Army, and part of the System of Public Security and Brazilian Social Protection. Its members are called "State Military" person, and informally "brigadianos".

The primary mission of BMRS is ostensibly preventive policing for the maintenance of public order in the State of Rio Grande do Sul. Originally the Military Brigade served as a state army before transitioning to a police force, but differently from other Brazilian states, Rio Grande do Sul kept their original name, being the only military police in Brazil to not use such name.

Under the United Nations, in cooperation with the Brazilian Army, the Military Brigade of Rio Grande do Sul has served in Guinea-Bissau and Haiti.

== See also ==
- Military Police of Brazil
- Brazilian Federal Police
- National Force of Public Safety
- Federal Highway Police
- Brazilian Civil Police
- Gendarmerie
- Governor of Rio Grande do Sul
