= Isidoro Dias Lopes =

Brigadier general of the Brazilian army

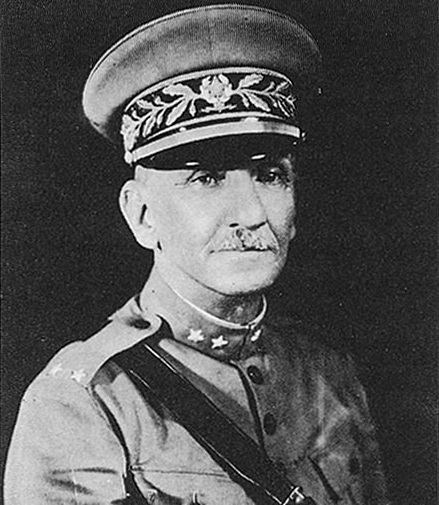
- Lopes, c. 1920
- Born: 30 June 1865; Dom Pedrito, Rio Grande do Sul, Empire of Brazil
- Died: 27 May 1949 (aged 83); Rio de Janeiro, Federal District, Brazil
- Military career
- Allegiance: Empire of Brazil; Brazil
- Branch: Imperial Brazilian Army; Brazilian Army
- Service years: 1883–1937
- Rank: Brigadier general
- Commands: 2nd Military Region
- Conflicts: Federalist Revolution; São Paulo Revolt of 1924; Revolution of 1930; Constitutionalist Revolution

Isidoro Dias Lopes (30 June 1865 – 27 May 1949) was a brigadier general of the Brazilian army, often styled the "Marshal of the Revolution of 1924".

== Early life ==
Lopes was born in the city of Dom Pedrito, Rio Grande do Sul, on 30 June 1865, son of José Tavares Bastos Rios and Jacinta Barros Lopes. He joined the army in 1883 through the Military School of Porto Alegre, completed a course in artillery and was promoted to lieutenant in 1891. He supported the movement to bring the Empire of Brazil to an end. In 1893, he left the army and took part in the Federalist Revolution in Rio Grande do Sul, against the government of president Floriano Peixoto. After the defeat of the federalists, in 1895, he went into exile in Paris. In 1896, he benefited from an amnesty and returned to Brazil, resuming his position in the army in Rio de Janeiro.

== 1924 São Paulo revolt ==
Dias Lopes was one of the leaders of the 1924 revolt. He had started the conspiracy against president Artur Bernardes the previous year after a reform of the military, by which time he was already a general. In 1924, he was elected leader by the conspirators and spent time organising forces in Paraná and Rio Grande do Sul. Together with Joaquim do Nascimento Fernandes Távora, he planned to occupy the city of São Paulo. Armed conflict broke out there on 5 July 1924, scheduled to coincide with the second anniversary of the uprising at Fort Copacabana.

The rebels took over the quarters of the Public Force of São Paulo and the 2nd Military Region and took their commanders prisoner. They were assisted by sympathisers such as pt:Miguel Costa, a major in the Public Force. This action forced the governor of São Paulo, Carlos de Campos, to abandon the city, effectively surrendering it to rebel control. However, following several days of unsuccessful attempts to negotiate a settlement, federal troops surrounded the rebels and laid siege to the city, bombing it with artillery and aircraft. The bombardment and shooting by federal forces killed hundreds of innocent civilians.

Towards the end of July, government forces began to prevail in the fighting, and Lopes ordered the rebels to fall back in the direction of Paraná. There they linked up with rebel units led by Luís Carlos Prestes to form the so-called Prestes Column, which carried out guerilla campaigns in the Brazilian interior. Eventually, Isidoro decided to go into exile in Argentina, where he continued to voice his support for the rebels. Because of his prestige among those forces, he became known as “Marshal of the Revolution”.

In 1927, the campaigns by the Prestes Column ended, and some of its leaders joined Lopes in Argentina. In time, most, including Lopes, were marginalised, and the disunity in the rebel movement left only Carlos Prestes as the recognised leader.

== Revolution of 1930 ==
In 1930, with the victory of Júlio Prestes in the presidential elections, the defeated candidate Getúlio Vargas began to plan a coup d'état against president Washington Luis. Isidoro Dias Lopes joined his movement, the most senior military figure to do so. However, he was eventually displaced by Colonel Pedro Aurélio de Góis Monteiro. During the Revolution of 1930, he assumed the rebel command of 2nd Military Region in São Paulo. Once installed in power, Getúlio Vargas offered him the title of marshal, which he declined on the grounds that he was already the "marshal" of the Revolution of 1924. He then returned to an official role in the Brazilian army as brigadier general.

== Later career and death ==
In 1931, frustrated with the direction the Vargas government was taking, he became critical of it, particularly as concerned the political leadership in São Paulo. He wrote to the president criticising the federal intervener of São Paulo, João Alberto, and the commander of the Força Pública Paulista, Miguel Costa. Getúlio Vargas eventually removed him from the command of the 2nd Military Region and appointed Colonel Góis Monteiro in his place. Lopes was offered the role of federal intervener in Rio de Janeiro as compensation, but he declined the offer.

By 1932, he had turned to open opposition to Vargas and joined the campaign to return the country to constitutional rule, taking part in the movement that was to lead to the Constitutionalist Revolution in 1932. He was initially named provisionally as leader of the movement, but eventually general Bertoldo Klinger became head of the Constitutionalist army. Following this conflict, he went into exile again, this time to Portugal, but returned to Brazil in 1934 following a general amnesty. His involvement was sought by the leaders of what was to become the Communist uprising of 1935, but he declined to become involved. He was critical of the coup d'état of 1937 led by Vargas and Góis Monteiro, which established the dictatorship of the Estado Novo.

Lopes died on 27 May 1949. According to those close to him, he was lucid and strong to the end of his life.
