= Paraná Campaign =

1924–5 civil conflict in Brazil

- Part of Tenentism
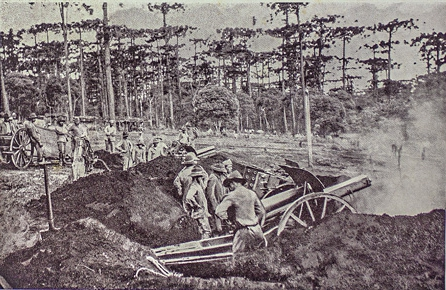
- 3rd Heavy Artillery Group in the bombardment of Catanduvas
Date	31 August 1924 – 30 April 1925
Location	Western Paraná, Brazil
Result	Government victory: Formation of the Prestes Column

Belligerents
Tenentist rebels	Brazil: Brazilian Army; Public Forces: São Paulo; Paraná; Rio Grande do Sul; Santa Catarina; Bahia; Irregulars ("patriots")

Commanders and leaders
Isidoro Dias Lopes; Miguel Costa; Luís Carlos Prestes; Juarez Távora	Cândido Rondon; Otávio de Azeredo; Nestor Sezefredo

Strength
3,000 men	12,000 men

The Paraná Campaign was the continuation of the São Paulo Revolt of 1924 in western Paraná from 1924 to 1925, concluding with the formation of the Miguel Costa-Prestes Column. Rebel tenentists, led by Isidoro Dias Lopes, withdrew from São Paulo, went down the Paraná River and settled in the region from Guaíra to Foz do Iguaçu, from where they faced the forces of the Brazilian government, commanded by general Cândido Rondon from October 1924. In April 1925, another rebel column, led by Luís Carlos Prestes, arrived from Rio Grande do Sul and joined the São Paulo rebels. They entered Paraguay to escape the government siege and returned to Brazil through southern Mato Grosso, continuing their armed struggle.

The conflict had a strong impact on the physical and social structures of the region and brought attention to the outside world to the Brazilian national consciousness. Several of the participating revolutionaries later occupied positions of power in the Estado Novo, which, seeking to integrate the region into the country, promoted the March to the West.

== Arrival in Paraná ==
Long before the arrival of the rebels, on 15 July, captain Dilermando de Assis was sent with a 60-man Provisional Regiment to defend Guaíra, which he called an "impregnable Constantinople". On 31 August, the revolutionaries' vanguard, commanded by general João Francisco Pereira de Souza, took the first position in Paraná's territory, Porto São José. Guaíra had good defensive positions, but was abandoned with little resistance on 14 September, opening the way to Foz do Iguaçu, which was taken by the rebels on the 24th. Their expansion was rapid, and the cavalry moved east to Catanduvas. Emissaries of the Rio Grande do Sul conspirators, where another revolt was imminent, met with the São Paulo rebels.

The bulk of the revolutionary army was slow to arrive, due to the small number of vessels and the need to do reconnaissance. On 23 September, the São Paulo rebels were still on the islands between São Paulo and Mato Grosso. They were attacked by loyalists from the 4th Military Circumscription of Mato Grosso, and an entire battalion surrendered. Only on 14 October did general Isidoro Dias Lopes land in Guaíra. By the end of October, the rebels were all in a triangle formed by the Paraná, Piquiri and Iguaçu rivers, an area larger than Switzerland, with two sides secured by international borders (with Argentina and Paraguay) and the rest covered through the Serra do Medeiros and other geographic features.

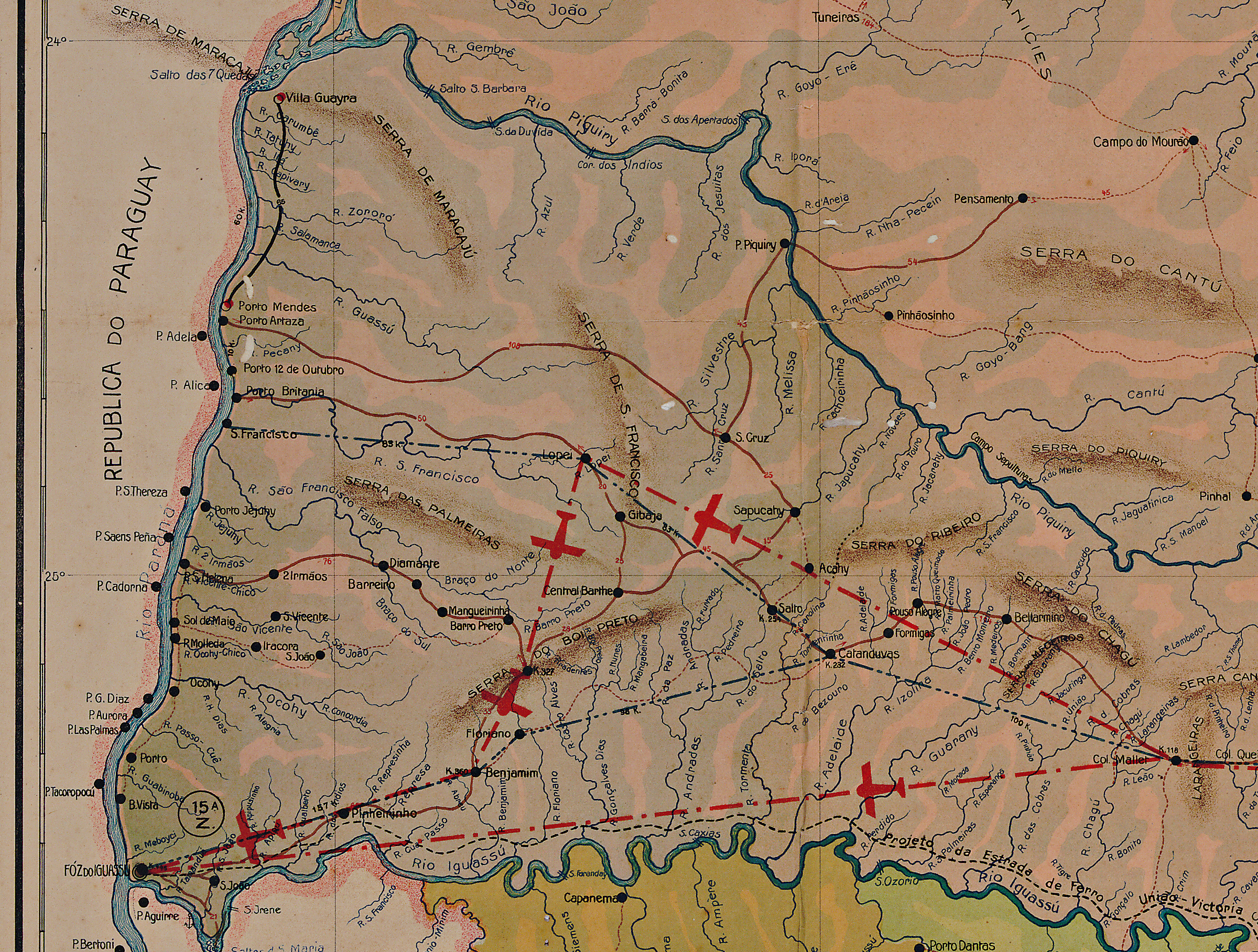
Conflicted region in Paraná

Accustomed to cities, towns and plantations, the São Paulo rebels found a new type of warfare in western Paraná. The territory was covered with dense forest and had a low population density. The dense pine forests and the thorny vegetation imposed harsh conditions on the soldiers. The local population was more Argentine and Paraguayan than Brazilian, the most common language was Spanish and the currency was the Argentine peso. Economic activity was dominated by "obrages", large rural areas for the extraction of wood and yerba mate, with labor subject to debt slavery.

The government reacted, assembling an army that reached more than 12,000 men, under the command of general Rondon. Under his orders were units of the Brazilian Army, state forces and patriotic battalions. Rondon preferred the Military Force of Paraná and other state militaries over army officers, as they were sympathetic to the rebels. The rebels had about 3,000 men. On 28 October, new revolts broke out in Rio Grande do Sul.

== Trench warfare ==
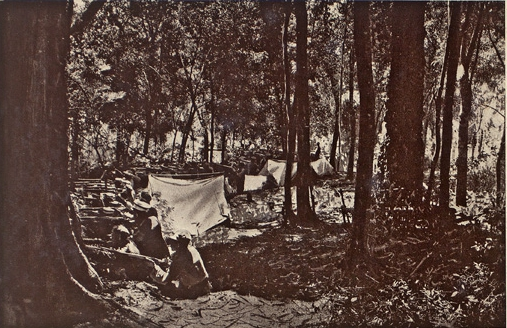
Trenches of the 13th Battalion of Caçadores in Catanduvas

The rebels tried to advance eastwards, as far as Guarapuava and Ponta Grossa, to establish a rail link with Rio Grande do Sul. In November, they met the loyalists at the top of Serra do Medeiros, where they were repelled, retreating to Belarmino and Formigas, which they would lose until the end of the year, retreating to the surroundings of Catanduvas, where they remained on the defensive. Both the São Paulo officers and general Rondon thought in terms of static warfare, with large units and massive frontal attacks. This assured a loyalist victory, as they received reinforcements and supplies, while the rebels had no regular supplies.

The battle for Catanduvas resulted in a war of improvised trenches, dug very close to enemy positions. Both sides faced harsh conditions, especially the rebels, as they were short on ammunition and food. The environment was very prone to the proliferation of diseases, which killed more than combat wounds. General Rondon avoided infantry attacks, opting to wear down the rebels with artillery, howitzers and mortars. Morale was slowly eroded, and both sides had large numbers of deserters, especially the rebels.

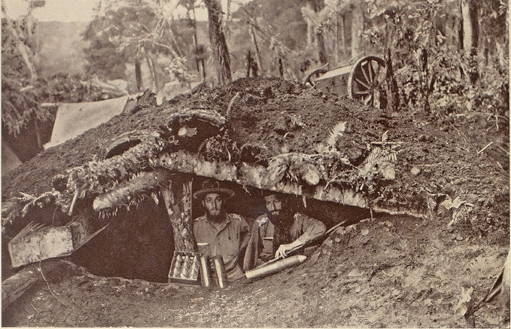
Shelter for artillery ammunition

Much of the rebel force was in reserve rather than in Catanduvas. In January they planned to attack Catanduvas and send the Death Column against the enemy rear in Formigas; the first part of the plan did not occur, as the loyalists launched their own rearguard attack. The invasion of Formigas, through an open trail in the forest, took the loyalist camp by surprise, culminating in a hand-to-hand combat. The attackers had to retreat after reinforcements arrived, but the battle delayed loyalist plans.

== Link of the Rio Grande do Sul and the São Paulo rebels ==
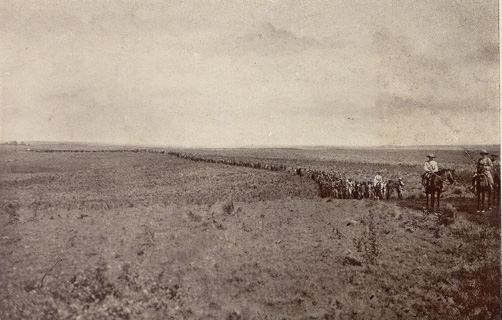
War prisoners from Catanduvas

In February there were unsuccessful peace talks in Posadas, Argentina. On 27 March, the final offensive against Catanduvas began, with 4,000 attackers against 500 defenders. From 07:00 to 13:00, the artillery fired 1,200 shells into the trenches, followed by a frontal and general attack. On 30 March, 404 defenders surrendered, while a minority still managed to escape. The survivors were sick, barefoot and gaunt, their clothes in tatters. General Rondon promised humane treatment to the prisoners, but as soon as they left his jurisdiction, they were treated with brutality, and banished to the penal colony of Clevelândia, in Amapá, from where few would return alive.

The other rebels retreated towards the Paraná River. On the way, remnants of the October Rio Grande do Sul revolt, led by Luís Carlos Prestes, finally reached the São Paulo rebels in the locality of Benjamim, on 3 April. With the two columns united, the plan was to proceed to Mato Grosso, but the rebels had made the mistake of abandoning Guaíra, which was occupied by Mato Grosso loyalists on 9 April. They tried to retake the city but were repulsed. An attempt to break through to the east failed.

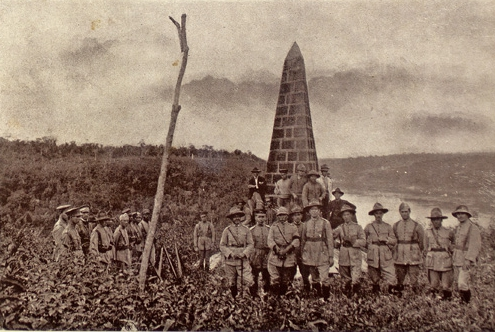
General Rondon at Brazil's border marker with Argentina in Foz do Iguaçu

The rebels were now trapped at the "bottom of a bottle", with no apparent way out. Command remained with Isidoro, with the São Paulo rebels, around 1,400 men, commanded by Miguel Costa, and the Rio Grande do Sul column, half that number, under Prestes. On 12 April, with the revolutionary command meeting in Foz do Iguaçu, Prestes suggested crossing the international border and crossing Paraguay to return to Mato Grosso, where they would fight a guerrilla war. The idea was accepted. Isidoro went into exile, from where he would seek weapons and political support, while command of the "1st Revolutionary Division" remained with Miguel Costa. The combatants from São Paulo came under the command of Juarez Távora. On 27 April the rebels began a three-day crossing to Paraguay, finishing the war in Paraná.
