= Domingos Passos =

Brazilian anarchist and syndicalist

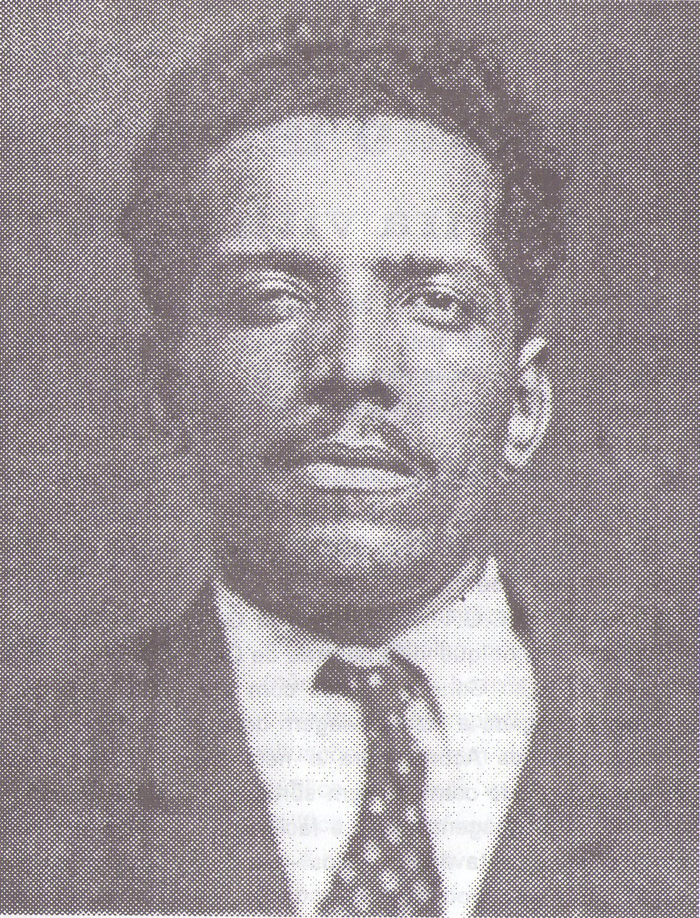
- Born: Unknown; Rio de Janeiro, Brazil
- Disappeared: 1928; Sengés, Brazil
- Occupation: Carpenter
- Known for: Anarchist and labor activism

Domingos Passos was a Brazilian anarchist and syndicalist activist from Rio de Janeiro. A Black man, he was a son of two ex-slaves freed right after the abolition. His birth date is unknown and there is almost no records about his early years. Working as a carpenter, he became involved with the civil construction workers union and was converted to anarchism. Soon, Passos stood out for his activism and rhetoric, becoming one of his union's leaders. He was also elected to represent the civil construction workers at the Third Brazilian Workers' Congress, in 1920.

Passos intense activities within the labor movement made him one of the most persecuted anarchists by the authorities, and he was jailed several times. In the repression following the São Paulo Revolt of 1924, in which some labor leaders took part, Passos was jailed in the 4th Auxiliary Police Bureau and deported to the penal colony of Clevelândia, on the border with French Guiana. Under his escape plan, he and other prisoners crossed the French Guianese border and fled to Belém, where Passos stayed until 1927.

Returning to Rio de Janeiro, Passos resumed his labor activism, but soon moved to São Paulo, where he had an important role in the reorganization of the São Paulo Workers' Federation and organized a committee to agitate for Sacco and Vanzetti. Under the new "Miscreant Law", which imposed serious restrictions to freedom of press and assembly, Passos was arrested in a pro-Sacco and Vanzetti meeting and remained forty days jailed at a Cambuci police station. Upon his release, he travelled to Pelotas in January 1928 to participate in the Fourth Workers' Congress of Rio Grande do Sul, returning to São Paulo right after this congress.

In February 1928, he was jailed again and remained incommunicable by orders of the Department for Political and Social Order's Ibrahim de Almeida Nobre. Passos stayed imprisoned in a dark, windowless cell of the Cambuci police station, receiving food only once a day. Released from prison, he was sent in a train and left to die in Sengés. He found shelter in a local village and wrote his comrades from São Paulo asking for money, which was delivered by a trusted emissary. Passos then disappeared, his fate unknown.

== Early years and activism ==
There is almost no records about Domingos Passos's early years. Born in Rio de Janeiro, likely in the last decade of the 19th century, his exact birth date is unknown. He was the son of ex-slaves emancipated right after the abolition. When he began to work in civil construction as a carpenter, Passos soon became involved in the activities of the General Union of Civil Construction Workers (Portuguese: União Geral dos Operários em Construção Civil), where he first found anarchist and syndicalist ideas. A self-taught man, he often spent his nights at the library of the Spanish anarchist Florentino de Carvalho, which was quite close to the union's headquarters. His early activism is closely linked with his union.

Passos gained notoriety during the 1917–1919 Brazil strike movement. On June 22, 1917, most Rio de Janeiro unions went on strike, led by civil construction workers, metalworkers, textile workers, bakers, tailors, and hatters. This strike movement was harshly repressed, arresting labor activists, closing unions, and outlawing the Rio de Janeiro Workers' Federation (Portuguese: Federação Operária do Rio de Janeiro, or FORJ). The authorities closed the headquarters of the renamed Civil Construction Workers Union (Portuguese: União dos Operários em Construção Civil) for seventy days after it took an active part in the attempted November 1918 anarchist uprising. In April 1919, anarchists gained control over the Civil Construction Workers Union's direction, abolishing the leadership positions and giving the union a federalist and non-hierarchical organizational structure. In May 1919, the civil construction workers won an eight-hour day through their union. The union took part in the foundation of a new Rio de Janeiro Workers' Federation (Portuguese: Federação dos Trabalhadores do Rio de Janeiro, or FTRJ), succeeding two outlawed workers' federations. In that context, Passos was elected for the Civil Construction Workers Union's executive committee, serving as second-secretary from October to December and then as first-secretary from January to July 1920.

Soon Passos became one of the preeminent labor activists of his time. His comrades described him as multiplying audiences at rallies, where his "smooth oratory", simultaneously "engaging and aggressive", made him a highly anticipated speaker. Passos was frequently invited to speak at workers' union conferences, speaking on the so-called "social question". He also participated in workers festivals, acting in plays organized by Grupo Renovação, an anarchist theatre group. In 1920, Passos was elected along José Teixeira to represent the Civil Construction Workers Union in the Third Brazilian Workers' Congress. This congress elected an Executive Commission to coordinate the resolutions made at the congress. It was composed of a general secretary, a treasurer, and five traveling secretaries, each one responsible for one of the five geographical regions of Brazil. Passos was elected to serve as traveling secretary for the country central region.

Passos was a staunch critic of Bolshevism, which gained strength in Brazil after the foundation of a Communist Party (PCB) in 1922. Right before the PCB's foundation, in March 1922, the Civil Construction Workers Union published a manifesto reproaching the Soviet government, claiming that in Russia "some members of the Communist Party, enthroned in power, exercise the dictatorship in the name of the proletariat" and denouncing that "all left-wing revolutionaries, especially anarchist combatants, are being persecuted, imprisoned and killed". Passos was certainly one of the authors of this manifesto, which ended in affirmation that the Civil Construction Workers Union would be "in opposition to the dictatorship and its dictators". In 1923, as communist influence grew in the Rio de Janeiro Workers' Federation (FTRJ), anarchists joined to refound the Rio de Janeiro Workers' Federation (FORJ). One of its main creators, Passos was elected to its Federal Committee. Civil construction workers, shoemakers, coopers, naval carpenters, food workers, tile builders, metalworkers and stonemasons were among the unions that joined the FORJ.

== Prison and deportation ==
Passos's intense activism made him one of the most persecuted anarchists by the authorities. After the tenentista revolt of Copacana Fort in July 1922, O Trabalho, the Civil Construction Workers Union journal in which Passos was an active collaborator, was closed by the repression like many other anarchist and labor periodicals. In 1923, under police persecution, Passos resigned the Civil Construction Workers Union Executive Committee and left to help the local unions of Paraná, but returned to Rio in time to help refound the anarchist Rio de Janeiro Workers' Federation (FORJ). Following the São Paulo Revolt of 1924, in which some labor leaders took part, the Brazilian Congress declared a state of siege for sixty days in the Federal Capital, the state of Rio de Janeiro, and the state São Paulo, authorizing the President Artur Bernardes to extend it to other states. Rio de Janeiro police arrested Passos and other anarchists who gathered the night that the São Paulo revolt broke out. The repression closed unions and labor periodicals. Dozens of anarchists and syndicalists were jailed or deported.

Domingos Passos remained twenty days jailed at the Central Police Station before being sent to the prison ship Campos, anchored at the Guanabara Bay. He remained three months at the prison ship, chopping the rust of the ship's hull. Passos was transferred to Comandante Vasconcellos and deported to the penal colony of Clevelândia do Norte, on the border with French Guiana, alongside other anarchist activists, rebel soldiers, beggars, procurers, and thieves. The prisoners worked nine hours a day without payment and were housed in sheds. Those without housing slept under the floorboards or under the trees, subject to humidity, reptiles, centipedes, mosquitoes, and rats. In three months, many prisoners already had contracted malaria, shigellosis, or beriberi. Passos himself contracted malaria. As the Simões Lopes Hospital filled, Passos described the new auxiliary infirmary as "the terror of the deportees" and a fast track to the cemetery.

Despite his sickness and mistreatment, Passos managed to teach literacy classes and spread anarchist propaganda among the prisoners. On May Day 1925, Passos, Domingos Brás, other deportees, and local settlers gathered to sing "The Internationale" on the banks of the Oyapock River. On another occasion, Passos gathered eight deportees at the Epitácio Pessoa Square to protest their treatment, but were soon silenced by the penal colony director and armed soldiers.

After some months in Clevelândia do Norte, Passos planned a successful escape to the port of Saint George, French Guiana. He was accompanied by his comrades Domingos Brás, Pedro Augusto Motta, Manuel Ferreira Gomes, José Batista da Silva, and Tomás Deslits Borghe. In Saint George, they were free of privation and mistreatment but after a month without jobs, they found themselves in desperate financial straits without means to pay for transport to Belém do Pará. Motta and others died in Saint George. The diseases contracted in the jungle forced the group to seek medicine in Caiena, where they found shelter offered by a local créole. Eventually, Passos, Brás and Batista da Silva managed to arrive in Belém. Passos stayed there for a while, helped by local anarchists and syndicalists.

== Return ==
In 1927, after the end of the state of siege imposed by Artur Bernardes, Passos returned to labor activism in Rio de Janeiro, where he found a labor movement highly polarized between anarchists and communists. In a solemn May Day session at the Quarry Workers' Center, Passos addressed the workers, encouraging them to participate in an anarchist-organized demonstration at Praça Onze and to avoid the communist-organized rally at Praça Mauá. The anarchist demonstration reunited a large crowd of workers and the newspaper Correio da Manhã ignored the Praça Mauá meeting, highlighting the FORJ's "beautiful solemnities" that "literally filled" Praça Onze. However, disputes between anarchists and communists weakened direct action unionism in Rio de Janeiro and reformists gained strength.

Passos then moved to São Paulo, where anarchism still had a great influence in the labor movement, helping local activists refound the São Paulo Workers' Federation and create a Pro-Sacco and Vanzetti Agitation Committee. Also in 1927, Passos was nominated by Domingos Brás to represent Brazil as a delegate in the Continental Libertarian Conference organized by the Mexican General Confederation of Workers and the Argentine Regional Workers' Federation, but the Brazilian anarchists were unable to raise funds to support his travel costs. The anarchist journal A Plebe attributed the indifference facing that conference to the "amorphous organizations that have no other horizon than the narrow circle of its own corporations" and the "associations enslaved under the rule of Bolshevik politicking".

Passos was arrested during an August 1927 demonstration in support of Sacco and Vanzetti at Largo do Brás. His prison was justified by the "Miscreant Law", approved under the government of Washington Luís, which imposed serious restrictions to freedom of press and assembly, typifying the crimes of "deviate workers from the establishments in which they are employed through threats and embarrassment" and "causing or provoking ceasing or suspension of work through threats or violence to impose on workers or employers an increase or decrease of services or wages". Passos was taken to the Rua Barão de Jaguara police station, known as "Bastille of Cambuci", and remained there for forty days. After his release, he travelled to Pelotas in January 1928 to took part in the Fourth Workers' Congress of Rio Grande do Sul. Passos returned to São Paulo right after this congress and was arrested once again, alongside the shoemaker Affonso Festa. By orders of Ibrahim de Almeida Nobre, who was in charge of the Department for Political and Social Order (Portuguese: Departamento de Ordem Política e Social, or DOPS) at the time, Passos remained incommunicable in a dark, windowless cell of the Cambuci police station, receiving food only once a day.

== Disappearance ==
After three months, Passos was released from prison in rags and very wounded. He was sent by train and left to die in the forests of Sengés. He found shelter in a local village and wrote his anarchist comrades of São Paulo asking for money, which was delivered by a trusted emissary. Passos then disappeared and was not heard from again.

== See also ==
- Anarchism in Brazil
