= Penal colony of Clevelândia =

Penal colony in Brazil 1924–26

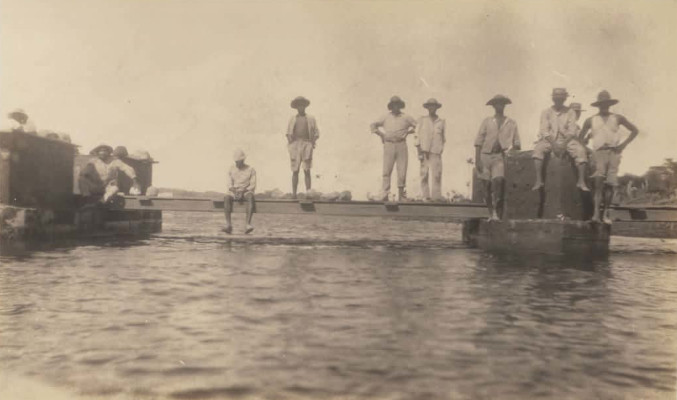
Workers on one of the colony's rivers in 1925

The penal colony of Clevelândia, located in the current district of Clevelândia do Norte, Amapá, functioned from 1924 to 1926 in the extreme north of Brazil, bordering French Guiana. It was installed in the "Cleveland Colonial Nucleus", an agricultural colony founded in 1922, and received a total of 946 to 1,630 prisoners. They included enemies of president Artur Bernardes' government (tenentist rebels, militant workers and anarchists) and common prisoners (criminals from the "dregs of society" and the homeless, capoeiras, and minors caught on the streets). They came from Paraná, São Paulo, Rio de Janeiro, Amazonas and Pará. In addition to these, the colony's population was made up of Brazilian Army guards, employees, traders and settlers, the last three totaling 204 inhabitants at the end of 1926. At the beginning of 1927, the Washington Luís administration allowed the prisoners to return.

The original agricultural colony was already losing its inhabitants to neighboring Martinica (present-day Oiapoque) in 1924, when the Bernardes government needed a remote and isolated prison. In response to the tenentist military revolts, the government had imposed a state of emergency and overcrowded prisons. Miguel Calmon, then Minister of Agriculture, offered the location, as it was the most remote agricultural colony in the country. This has precedents in the governments of Floriano Peixoto, who deported prisoners to the Amazon, and Rodrigues Alves, in the period after the Vaccine Revolt, as well as in other penal colonies around the world. The first ship with prisoners arrived at the mouth of the Oyapock River on 26 December 1924.

The sudden expansion of the colony's population overloaded the agricultural center's infrastructure. Testimonies from prisoners recorded precarious accommodation and usually unpaid labor in hot, humid and unhealthy conditions, as well as threat of violence from guards and some common criminals. The prison's workforce carried wooden logs to the sawmill, weeded the fields, built public facilities and worked in the pau-rosa mills. Military personnel who swore loyalty to the government performed technical and bureaucratic functions. In June 1925, soldiers from the Public Force of São Paulo, defeated in the battle of Catanduvas during the Paraná Campaign, brought an epidemic of shigellosis, which killed hundreds of prisoners along with other diseases such as malaria and tuberculosis. According to the official report Journey to the Cleveland Colonial Nucleus, out of 946 prisoners, 491 died and 262 escaped.

Press censorship suppressed the matter until the first months of 1927, when the prisoners returned and the penal colony became a front page topic, described as a "green hell" by the opposition and a "very common agricultural colony" by government supporters. Its history was permanently associated with president Artur Bernardes. It was remembered by anarchists and forgotten by historiography, for which it became the subject of its first major study only in 1991. Historians have characterized the penal colony as a forced labor camp or even as a concentration camp.

== Creation ==
=== The agricultural colony ===
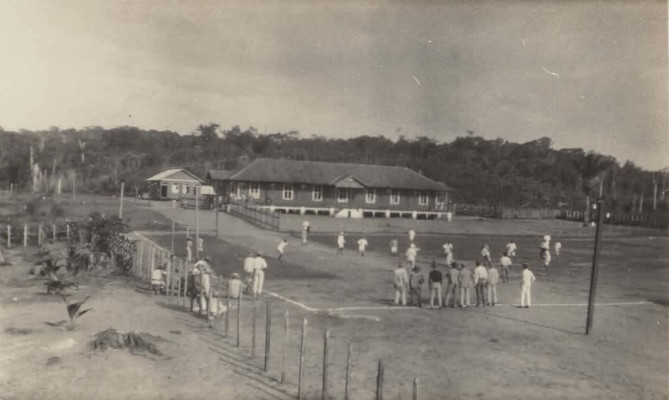
A football match in front of the administration house

Prisoners' memoirs often confuse Clevelândia with its wider region, Oiapoque, then part of the state of Pará and currently in Amapá. Oiapoque is located on Brazil's border with French Guiana and was an area of territorial disputes with France until its definitive incorporation into Brazilian territory in 1900. The region was considered an empty space, and its occupation had been studied by Brazilian authorities since the 1890s. In 1919, the Brazilian Congress approved senator Justo Chermont's proposal to found national patronages and colonies along the Oyapock River. Chermont warned the government against smugglers who took advantage of the lack of policing, inspection and military defense in that area. Colonization would eliminate French influence from the region and ensure Brazilian sovereignty.

The colony was established on the right bank of the Oyapock River, 15 kilometers from the military post of Santo Antônio, a few kilometers upstream from the village of Martinica. Both were part of the municipality of Amapá in the district of Demonti, whose total population was more than 1,150 in the 1920 census. The village of Saint-Georges was on the opposite (French) side of the river. The first settlers, refugees from the drought in Northeastern Brazil, arrived in May 1921. According to Rocque Pennafort, the population was made up of two distinct groups, one that accompanied colonel Chico Pennafort and the other of families from Ceará brought from Belém by the government. The region was believed to be an "Eldorado" of fertile lands, presented in government propaganda by photographs of a giant cassava root and a long sugar cane stalk. The healthiness of the region was attested to by a report signed in 1922 by the director of the Rural Prophylaxis Service of Pará. On 5 May 1922, the "Cleveland Agricultural Center" was inaugurated, named after Grover Cleveland, president of the United States who arbitrated the Palmas border dispute between Argentina and Brazil.

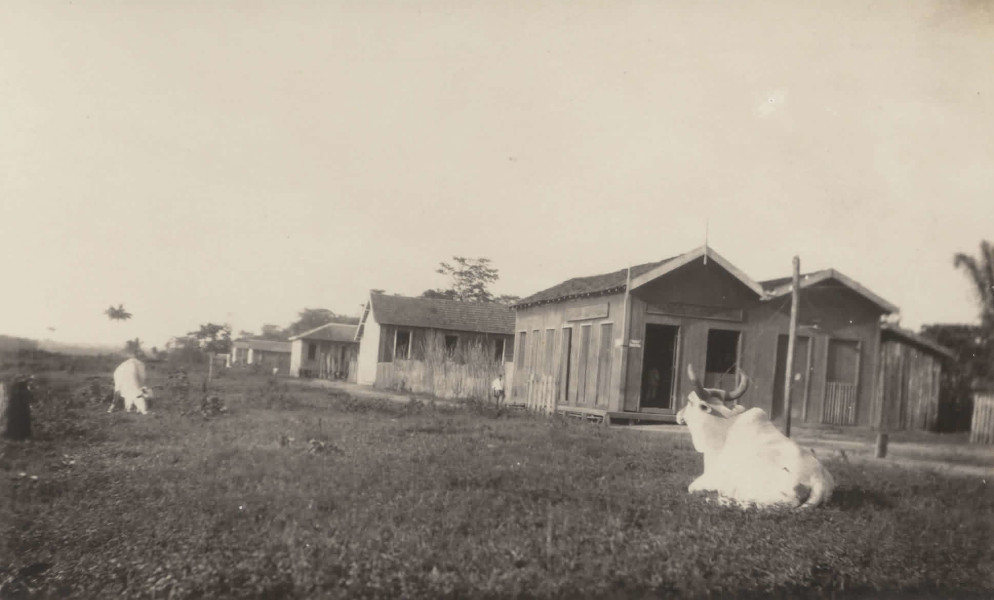
Cattle on Boulevard Rio Branco

The chief engineer, administrator and founder of the village was Gentil Norberto. Clevelândia was mean to be the "model area for a civilizational project". The urban area of the nucleus was planned, an unprecedented feat for towns in the region. Until 1924, a two-story administrative building, a school with two classrooms, a hospital, infirmary, immigrant hostel, telegraph office, sawmill, church, several residences and 28 kilometers of local roads were built. But the initial enthusiasm was lost and settlers who were unsuccessful with agriculture migrated to Martinica, where they found work in the pau-rosa mills. On 31 December 1926, the population, excluding prisoners and guards, was 204: 127 settlers and 77 employees and traders.

=== Transformation into a penal colony ===
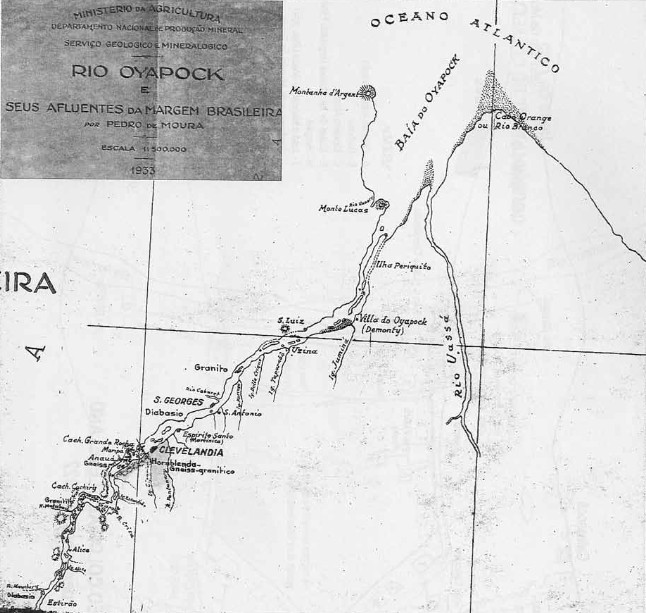
Location of Clevelândia on a 1933 map of the Oyapock River

The federal government of president Artur Bernardes (1922–1926) transformed Clevelândia into the largest destination for its political prisoners, in a context of a lasting state of emergency, overcrowded jails, mass arrests and internal exile. Tenentists defeated in their armed revolts against the government, militant workers (including anarchists), common criminals and "undesirables" removed from the streets of Rio de Janeiro had Clevelândia as their prison from 1924 onwards. By article 80 of the General Provisions of the Brazilian Constitution of 1891, in force at the time, the president could, during a state of emergency, resort to exile to maintain law and order. In the case of Clevelândia, an additional justification was a constitutional provision that gave the federal government control over the border strip necessary for national defense.

According to Bernardes, the idea of deporting prisoners to Clevelândia was not his, but that of his Minister of Agriculture, Miguel Calmon, or Gentil Norberto. According to former minister Calmon, "the government only deported to Clevelândia as a last resort and forced by habeas corpus requests to the Supreme Federal Court, which did not allow the prisoners to be kept here" [on prison ships and islands in Guanabara Bay], and "those deported to Clevelândia were prisoners who had the worst records and no special title to recommend them".

Miguel Calmon offered Bernardes lands under his Ministry of Agriculture's administration with room to receive prisoners: Ilha das Flores, the colonial centers of Paraná and Santa Catarina and the agricultural centers of Paraíba, Piauí, Pará (i.e. Clevelândia) and Amazonas. According to him, Ilha das Flores and Clevelândia would be the only viable ones, as the others were in territories at risk of revolts or the governors of their respective states did not want to host political prisoners.

Clevelândia was the most remote agricultural colony in the entire country, guaranteeing the isolation of prisoners and the impossibility of legal defense before courts. The prisoners would be punished for their crimes while also contributing to the occupation of the border region. The measure has precedents in republican Brazil, also in the equatorial jungle, when hundreds or even thousands of individuals were deported to Tabatinga, Xingu, the upper Rio Branco and Acre during the government of Floriano Peixoto (1891–1894) and in the post-Vaccine Revolt period (1904). This type of punishment in inhospitable regions can be compared to Devil's Island in French Guiana, the Italian domicilio coatto (confinement on islands in the Mediterranean), the Argentine prison in Ushuaia and the Russian gulag. Clevelândia was so isolated there was no direct telegraphic connection to Belém; until the construction of a radiotelegraph station in September 1926, communication passed through French Guiana to Paris and from there to Recife and Belém.

== Points of view ==
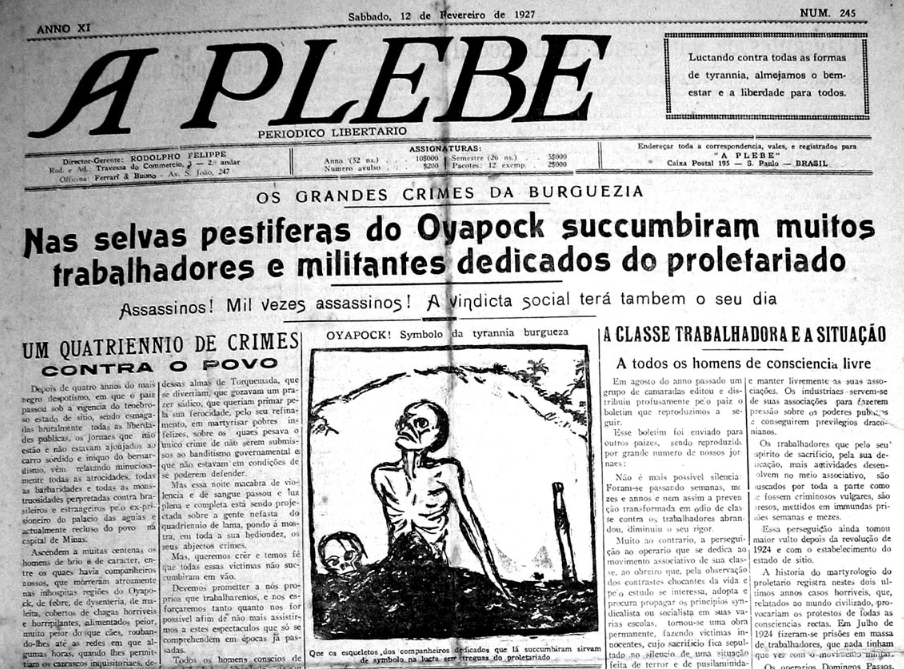
A Plebe issue on 12 February 1927, presenting the "great crimes of the bourgeoisie" that occurred in Oiapoque

The events in Clevelândia did not reach the press as a whole, which was under censorship during the state of emergency declared by the Bernardes government. Public opinion only had a superficial understanding of the events. Opposition deputies in the Chamber denounced many abuses that occurred during the state of emergency, but did not mention Clevelândia. The newcomers did not know what awaited them. The news only started to come out in September 1925, when a letter from Domingos Braz was published in the Lisbon anarcho-syndicalist newspaper A Batalha. In December 1925, another letter was published by the newspapers La Antorcha, from Buenos Aires, and O Syndicalista, from the Workers' Federation of Rio Grande do Sul. The government denied the accusations.

Only at the end of Artur Bernardes' term and the state of emergency did the story resonate with public opinion and the mainstream and alternative press brought testimonies from survivors. Government and opposition newspapers debated what the real conditions of the place were at the beginning of 1927, when the prisoners had already been amnestied. The opposition can be exemplified by the newspapers O Combate and A Nação, which represented the interests of the Democratic Party of São Paulo, tenentists and the Workers and Peasants Bloc, as well as A Plebe, representing the anarchists. The defenders of former president Bernardes and his government can be found in the Rio de Janeiro newspaper O Paiz. Justo Chermont's newspaper reported on the beauty and good climate of Clevelândia, and Gentil Norberto would publicly defend the place.

The play Clevelândia (1927), by Euclides de Andrade, criticized the First Brazilian Republic in a humorous tone from the point of view of a caipira arrested in São Paulo for saluting the revolutionaries in 1924. The play was well received by the public in São Paulo. In Mr. Slang e o Brasil (1927), writer Monteiro Lobato interpreted Clevelândia as the possible destination of the country's thinking minds. Lobato wrote of doctor Belisário Penna: "He has done so much good for his land and will do so much more that - write what I'm going to say: he will end up in Clevelândia".

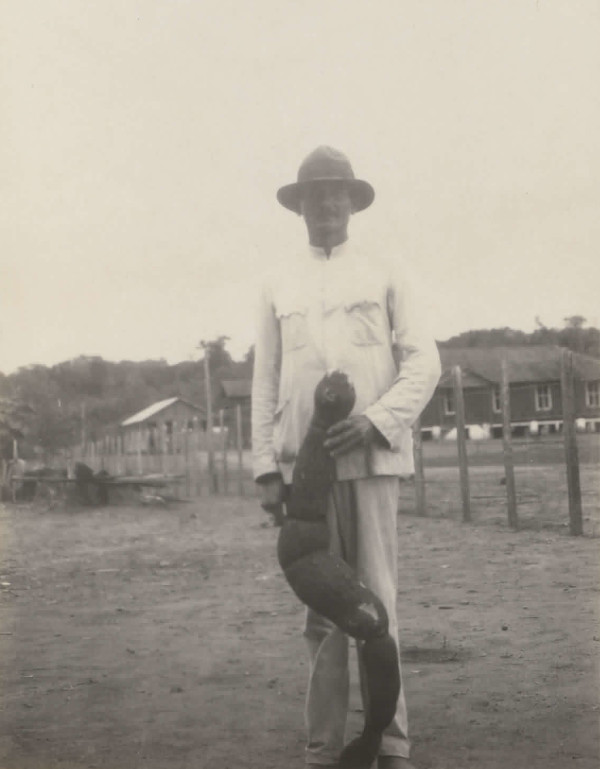
Official propaganda photograph showing a settler and the cassava root harvested on his plot

The opposition denounced the "horrors" and the "Clevelandian hecatomb", "the extermination of prisoners" and "the crimes of the Bernardes government". The contemporary press and historiography associate Clevelândia with exile and demographic emptiness. Expressions such as "green hell", "Brazilian Siberia", "garden of torments", "exile of plague and death", "pestilent jungles" and "inhospitable place" were common in the newspapers. The colony entered anarchist memory as a symbol of oppression, the "Brazilian Bastille".

The revelations put pro-government press on the defensive. O Paiz criticized opposition publications in the article "The demagoguery industry and the Clevelândia bonanza". The newspaper softened the region's image, calling it a "very common agricultural colony" and a "peaceful cassava plantation". Reversing the accusations, it asserted that "those who today cry out with an olive branch in hand, for general peace, were the ones who lit and fueled the fire of rebellion that has been drenching the national territory in blood for so many years", and that "if there had not been a revolution the government would not have been forced to take some severe measures".

For historian Carlo Romani, historiography let the history of Cleveland fall into oblivion. Official silence about the region was broken by the Brazilian Army itself when its official library published Clevelândia do Norte, by priest Rogério Alicino, in 1971. Alicino had an affinity with the interests of the State and relied on official documents. His book dedicated only five pages to the penal experience; according to Romani, "the first extensive work on the episode was a chapter in Paulo Sérgio Pinheiro's book", Estratégias da ilusão: a revolução mundial e o Brasil (1922-1935) (1991). Pinheiro focused on state repression and social struggles. Local historians stick to the official version, seeking to prevent the history of Oiapoque from being tainted by the prison camp's brief existence.

Alexandre Samis, author of Clevelândia: anarquismo, sindicalismo e repressão política no Brasil (2002), had a similar perspective to Pinheiro. He and Romani have an ideological affinity with anarchism or libertarian socialism. For an additional historian of Clevelândia, Edson Machado de Brito, Pinheiro, Samis and Romani presented, each in their own way, the penal colony as a "milestone of the resistance's defeat". He, on the other hand, emphasizes that dissent survived the exile of part of the militant population in Clevelândia. Samis presents the exiles as citizens imprisoned without trial, while Brito points out the revolutionary threat that these dissidents represented to the State.

== Operation ==
=== Demographics ===
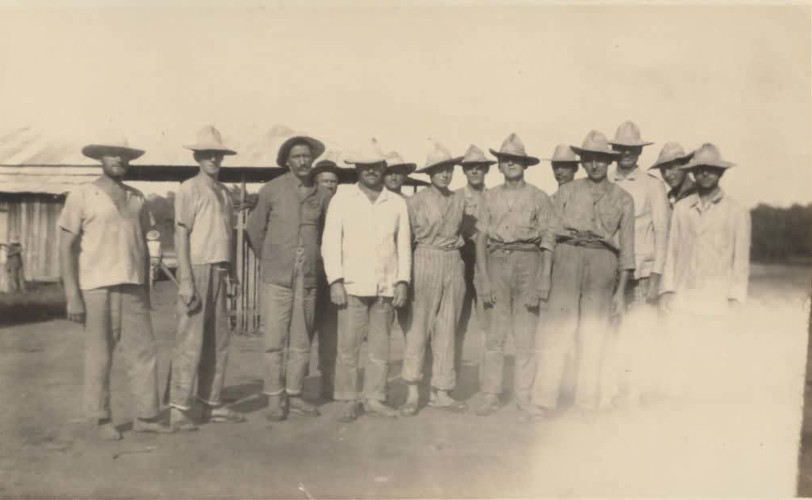
Newly arrived prisoners from Rio de Janeiro

The exact number of prisoners and deaths in Clevelândia was a constant concern in the press and historiography. The lowest number used by Pinheiro and Samis is 946, provided by the report Journey to the Cleveland Colonial Nucleus, presented by Oldemar Murtinho, director of the Secretariat of State Section to the Minister of Agriculture in 1926. The report identified 262 escapes and 491 deaths. Romani quantified around 1,200 exiles, based on the "classification drawn up by the police in the sending lists", and noted that there are many known cases of prisoners missing from the lists. The highest estimate was 1,630 men, according to Manoelzinho dos Santos. Security was provided by a detachment of the 26th Battalion of Caçadores, initially comprising 26 soldiers and later reinforced by another 120 when escapes became frequent.

The prisoners arrived in three large waves and smaller contingents on monthly boats on the Oiapoque-Belém line. The first 419, according to Murtinho, or 250, according to Alicino, arrived at the mouth of the Oyapock river on 26 December 1924. According to Romani, this first group included 250 military personnel and another 150 people arrested in Rio de Janeiro and São Paulo since the revolt on 5 July to early December. The soldiers of this group had served mainly on Brazilian Navy battleships and submarines in the capital, where, in October and November, the authorities had dismantled a coup planned by captain Protógenes Guimarães and overcome a revolt on the battleship São Paulo.

A second wave of 119 army and navy soldiers, involved in revolts in Amazonas and Pará, arrived on 6 January 1925. In July 1924, these states had been the stage of two tenentist movements, the Commune of Manaus and the revolt of the 26th Battalion of Caçadores. A third wave of soldiers (418, according to Murtinho, or 577, according to Alicino) arrived between 8 and 12 June 1925. According to Romani, there were around 400 soldiers from Catanduvas, Paraná, 23 conspirators from Rio de Janeiro and 130 thieves imprisoned by the 4th Auxiliary Police Bureau. The Paraná Campaign veterans were soldiers from the army and Public Force of São Paulo, coming from the São Paulo Revolt in July of the previous year, and had fought for months until their surrender on 30 March 1925.

There were officers in the colony, but the military exiles were mainly of lower ranks. The government intended to disqualify their hierarchical position, while anarchists wanted to identify them as "sons of the people" to incorporate them into the revolution. The civilians were opposition activists, workers (mainly in the printing and construction sectors), trade unionists (including leaders held on the Campos prison ship), workers' newspaper writers and common criminals. Many were foreigners. Some of the civilians were arrested as suspects and had neither a connection with political dissent nor the position of common criminals. What the police called "undesirables" included both common criminals (thieves, murderers, scoundrels and swindlers, the "dregs of society") as well as beggars, capoeiras and minors removed from the streets as a policy of "social prophylaxis".

Letters to the press identified at least 20 anarchists in Clevelândia. Many prisoners classified simply as workers or vagrants may also have been activists or sympathizers. The anarchists had no direct relationship with the tenentist revolts, but were arrested to dismantle their movement within the working class and intimidate other militants. In Clevelândia, the anarchists noticed an absence of their rivals in the working-class environment, the communists, and even assumed that they were allied with the Bernardes government. From a communist point of view, the newspaper A Nação countered what it called the "slanders" of anarchists and stated that many of "our comrades suffered in Clevelândia". Alexandre Samis could not find the name of any communist sent to the colony. Romani believes official repression to have been the main cause of the decline of anarchism in the 1920s.

=== Transport ===
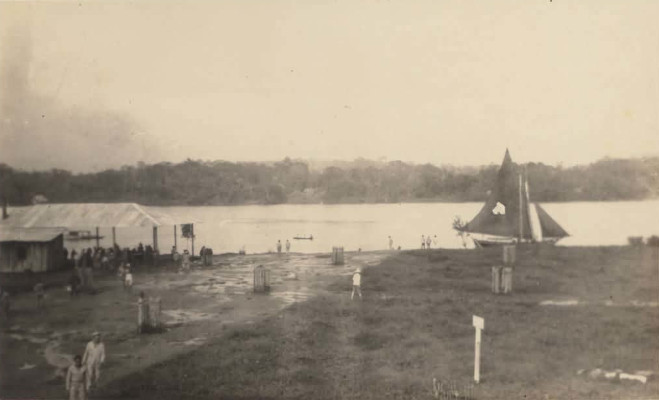
View of the port on the Oyapock River

The first prisoners came from Rio de Janeiro aboard the packet Commandante Vasconcellos. After a stop in Belém, the ship stopped at the mouth of the Oyapock river, where its draft prevented navigation upstream, so the prisoners continued on a river steamer, the gaiola ("cage"), to the port of Santo Antônio, and from there in smaller boats or on foot along the telegraph line trail to the prison depot in Clevelândia. Newly arrived prisoners were given a wide-brimmed straw hat, jacket and blue denim pants and assigned their activity.

Inmates from Catanduvas were already weakened before the journey. In the trenches of Paraná, those soldiers fought malnourished, sick and, for the most part, barefoot and half-naked. After surrendering, they walked in line and watched by armed guards for more than 100 kilometers to the Irati railway station. General Cândido Rondon, commander of the loyalist forces in the Paraná Campaign, promised humane treatment. There is no evidence that he was responsible for what was done to the prisoners when they left his jurisdiction, but he did not protest their treatment either, and the tenentist leaders never forgave Rondon for what happened.

In early June 1925, the prisoners embarked at the port of Paranaguá into the unventilated holds of the freighter Cuiabá. The trip to Oiapoque lasted 21 days, with a stop in Rio de Janeiro to supply water, coal and new prisoners, among them anarchists from prison ships on the state's coast. According to Atílio Lebre, a Portuguese prisoner embarked in Rio de Janeiro, the food on the ship consisted of a little mate and a biscuit, in the morning, and "a dish with black-eyed peas and one hundred grams of poorly cooked green meat", for the main meals. The food went down through the same opening through which the two wooden barrels in which the prisoners urinated and defecated went up. Water was rationed and prisoners spent days thirsty.

=== Accommodation and social organization ===
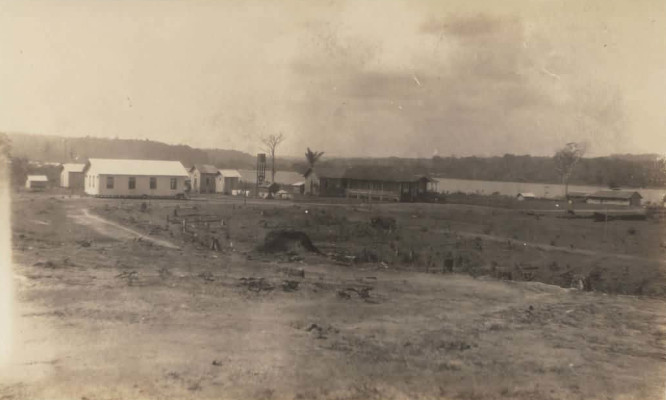
Inn and hospital seen from the telegraphy house

The penal colony operated under a semi-open regime, in which prisoners were free to move around, with the Oyapock River and the jungle itself as its walls. The original settlers were forced to bear the consequences, including the lack of accommodation, caused by the sudden growth of the population. The administration neglected them as it was focused on the prisoners. The settlers' initial reaction was fear, but many of the prisoners ended up being accepted into their midst, some even starting families.

The deportees were housed in sheds and, when these were not enough to cover the population, the excess population slept under trees or the floors of houses until they built small shelters in their free time. A warehouse next to the river served as an inn for immigrants. Plots abandoned by settlers who emigrated to Martinica were given to prisoners. While the prisoners had not finished building their huts and sheds, they were welcomed by some families (mostly in the case of more senior military personnel) or occupied the homes of families who temporarily moved to the Administration and neighboring buildings. According to Domingos Braz, the "unfortunate deportees sleep in groups of one hundred or more individuals. Filthy and disgusting sheds covered with boards or straw on top and sides, these are the accommodations".

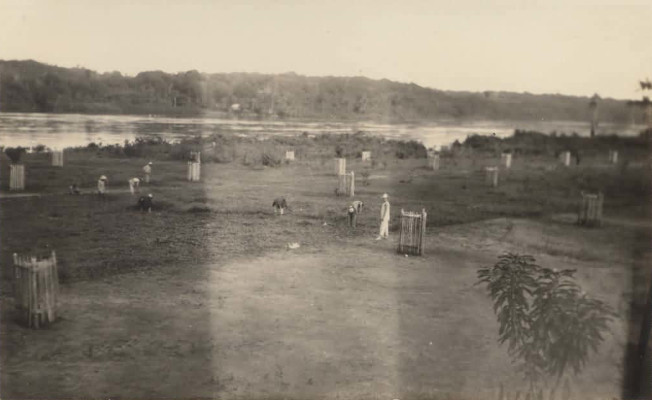
Work at Epitácio Pessoa Square

The prisoners were initially segregated into groups according to their origins, which meant that anarchists, tenentists and other factions were unable to help each other. Soldiers and officers who swore loyalty to the government, abandoning their revolutionary convictions, were given the best jobs, closer relations with the small local elite and greater freedom. Others remained within the hierarchy of the revolutionary army. Although at a lower level of the penal hierarchy, they lived close to the center and could count on the protection of their officers. These stayed in private houses provided by the Administration or temporary sheds near the center.

Civilian political prisoners, including anarchists, remained in collective sheds or huts further away, distributed among lots 10 to 14, on the banks of the Siparani stream. Libertarians were the most cohesive group in the colony. Anarchists found time for lectures, songs, and study during their idle moments, and some wrote poems during this period. The May Day of 1925 was celebrated by some anarchists and colonists by singing the Internationale. José Alves do Nascimento, a construction worker, taught the children of the farmers he lived with to read and write. Ordinary prisoners received the most distant lots, on the banks of the Porantani River, and the worst treatment.

=== Work ===
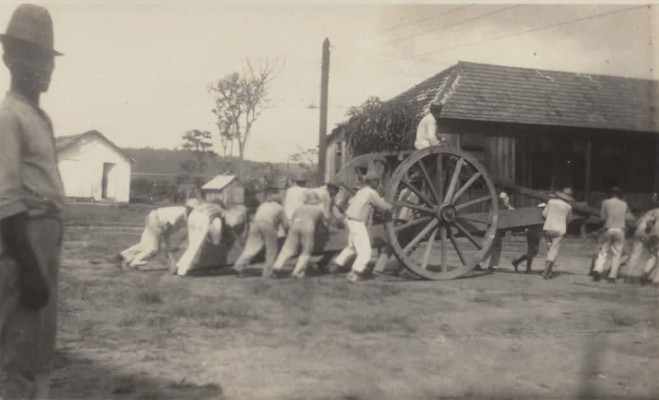
Prisoners carrying a wooden beam

There was now "plenty of manpower" after the arrival of large numbers of prisoners, according to Rogério Alicino's official narrative. For historians like Romani and Brito, Clevelândia was a forced labor camp. Gentil Norberto, in his defense of the colony, stated that only common criminals had been forced to work, and for only four and a half hours a day, cleaning the headquarters and other services, and received cigarettes and small wages. Writer Domingos Meirelles mentioned a nine-hour workday, in most cases without pay. A former soldier of the Public Force of São Paulo, in a statement to O Combate, described more than twelve hours of heavy duty a day.

According to Alicino, "in order to take advantage of all the labor [...] a plant was built near the place called Siberia to extract the pau-rosa essence". The prisoners also built the Our Lady of Nazareth chapel, the Dulphe Machado School, the Artur Bernardes Bridge, a warehouse, additional houses and a radio station, in addition to expanding the Simão Lopes Hospital and carrying out maintenance services. Everardo Dias cited the construction of the warehouse as an atrocity, during which prisoners suffering from malaria had to dive with bags of concrete.

The most privileged prisoners worked as bureaucrats in the Administration and the hospital, mechanics, electricians, cooks and foremen in the pau-rosa mills. These services were rewarded with annual bonuses of ten to 200 thousand réis. The heaviest labor weeding the fields and carrying logs from the river to the sawmill; these tasks were initially reserved for common criminals and later shared with Catanduvas veterans. Particularly heavy duty was rewarded with cigarettes. Burial work was initially exclusive to common Rio de Janeiro prisoners, such as the pickpocket "Moleque Cinco".

=== Life conditions ===
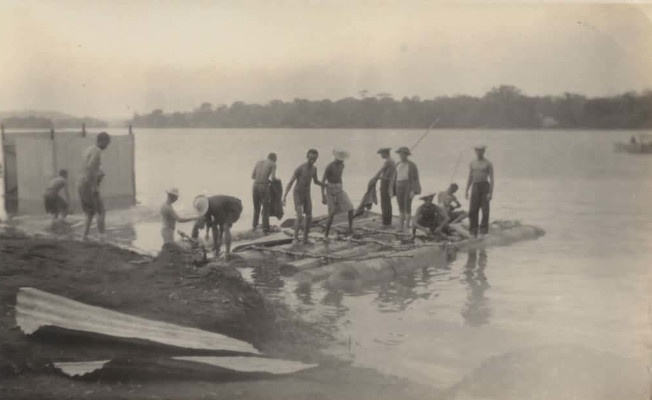
Prisoners washing clothes in the river

The customs, landscapes and climate of Oiapoque were strange to the prisoners, many of whom were urban people from southern Brazil. The humidity and heat were intense and diseases proliferated. The Agricultural Center sought an image of a civilized public office, but the services it offered were designed for a few hundred volunteers and were overwhelmed by the arrival of a much larger number of prisoners. According to Alicino, "the arrival, within a short period of time, of more than a thousand people, created serious problems in the life of the colony", and "the prisoners, on their part, did not fail to hinder life in the colony".

Miguel Calmon assured that the colony was "perfectly installed, with sufficient resources to distribute abundant food and equipped with an excellent hospital. Nothing was lacking in terms of food and medical assistance". Official inquiries in 1925 and 1926 concluded that food, housing and physical integrity of prisoners were guaranteed. O Paiz presented a document signed by more than twenty ex-convicts with thanks to Gentil Norberto and other employees, thanking "the good treatment given to us there, in addition to clothes, footwear, cigarettes, hats, medical and hospital assistance, good and abundant food and clothing in the inns built for this purpose". But the accusations echoed much more. According to many returned prisoners, they were forced, upon passing through Belém, to sign a document declaring that they had never suffered violence or deprivation. And according to the newspaper O Combate, Gentil Norberto lived in Belém and never spent more than 24 hours in the colony.

According to the chief engineer, one of his first initiatives after the arrival of the deportees was the strict prohibition of corporal punishment. Any abuse occurred "never with the support or concurrence of management". The contemporary press and historians record torture, ill-treatment and widespread violence against prisoners. Prisoners were punished with the "ox navel" (a type of whip), the paddle and the "hot refrigerator" or "cafua", a space with zinc roof tiles in which only one person could fit, who suffocated in the heat. Armed guards simulated firing squads. Some criminals, such as "Colonel Bahia", "Za-la-mort", "Rio Grande" and "Padeirinho", were allowed free passage through the village, which they traveled with the guards to physically discipline other prisoners.

In an episode narrated by the anarchist Domingos Passos, "Colonel Bahia" slapped an old bricklayer, nicknamed "Constructor", for his delay in arriving at the meal, resulting in a hemorrhage. Another prisoner, Antônio Salgado, was "put in irons" for protesting against what happened. Augusto da Silva Ramalho reported to O Combate that he was arrested for no reason and he and his companions "received orders to work, always watched by the colony's military garrison, who mistreated them at the first speech". Manoel dos Santos, a former sailor, mentioned the "chills when he remembered the torture to which he was subjected". Mateus Felix de Moura, a former sergeant in the Public Force of São Paulo, described a diet based on "hard beans, with large pieces of rotten and tasteless meat". According to Lauro Nicácio, an army junior, the quality and quantity of food decreased after Deocleciano Coelho de Souza took over management of the colony in July 1925.

Everardo Dias described the survivors as "weak, thin, yellowish, without courage, without spirit and without vitality", in whose "scarred, wax-colored faces only the eyes stood out... they looked like mummies". Oldemar Murtinho's report, which aimed at a positive presentation of the colony, described the prisoners as "ragged and sad" men, who walked like "those condemned to death who are heading to the gallows, slowing their pace", "giving the impression that malaria made them useless for the rest of their lives".

=== Mortality ===
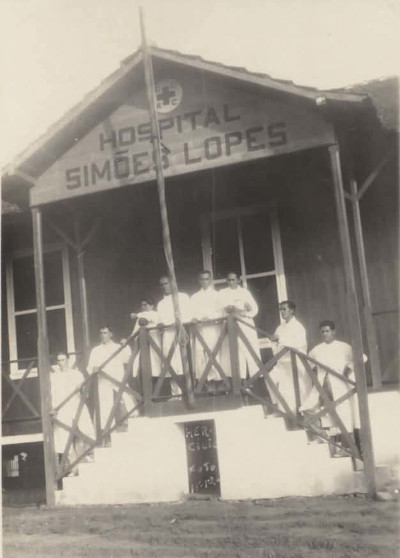
Doctors, pharmacists and nurses at the Simões Lopes Hospital

According to Bruno de Almeida Magalhães, a biographer of Artur Bernardes, "despite the salubrity of the place, there was an epidemic of typhoid fever, in which some prisoners perished", but "the entire legend about Clevelândia was unanswerably refuted by senator Miguel Calmon, the Minister of Agriculture during Bernardes' government, during the sessions of 29 and 30 October 1927, without suffering the slightest challenge [by anyone]". These allegations are contradicted by the high mortality of prisoners demonstrated in the specialized bibliography about the Clevelândia.

Based on Murtinho's report, Samis and Pinheiro quantified 491 dead prisoners, out of the original population of 946. According to the same report, the first record book was lost and with it, data on 88 deaths were lost. Romani estimated that more than half of his estimate of 1,200 prisoners died. On 7 January, A Nação announced a complete list of 325 dead in Clevelândia. On 4 February, a former navy sergeant, in charge of the local cemetery, told the newspaper that 650 prisoners died, not counting those who died while escaping. Others returned from the colony so weakened that they died days later, according to Everardo Dias. A spokesman for the Bernardes government stated in 1928 that mortality was approximately 43%.

Mortality came through diseases, the most common of which were bacillary dysentery, malaria and tuberculosis. According to Lauro Nicácio, a third of the prisoners had already died when the third wave arrived, in June 1925. On the other hand, according to prisoner Alberto Saldanha, until June 1925 only 35 prisoners were buried in the cemetery. This batch was the one that arrived in the worst condition; in the trenches of Catanduvas, soldiers were already suffering from scabies, dysentery and tungiasis. After their landing, an epidemic of bacillary dysentery spread among the prisoners and colonists. For this reason, Miguel Calmon highlighted in his defense of the government that bacillary dysentery killed many more prisoners than malaria, an endemic disease in the region. O Paiz argued that the epidemics were occasional, brought from the South, and ravaged several places, not just Clevelândia.

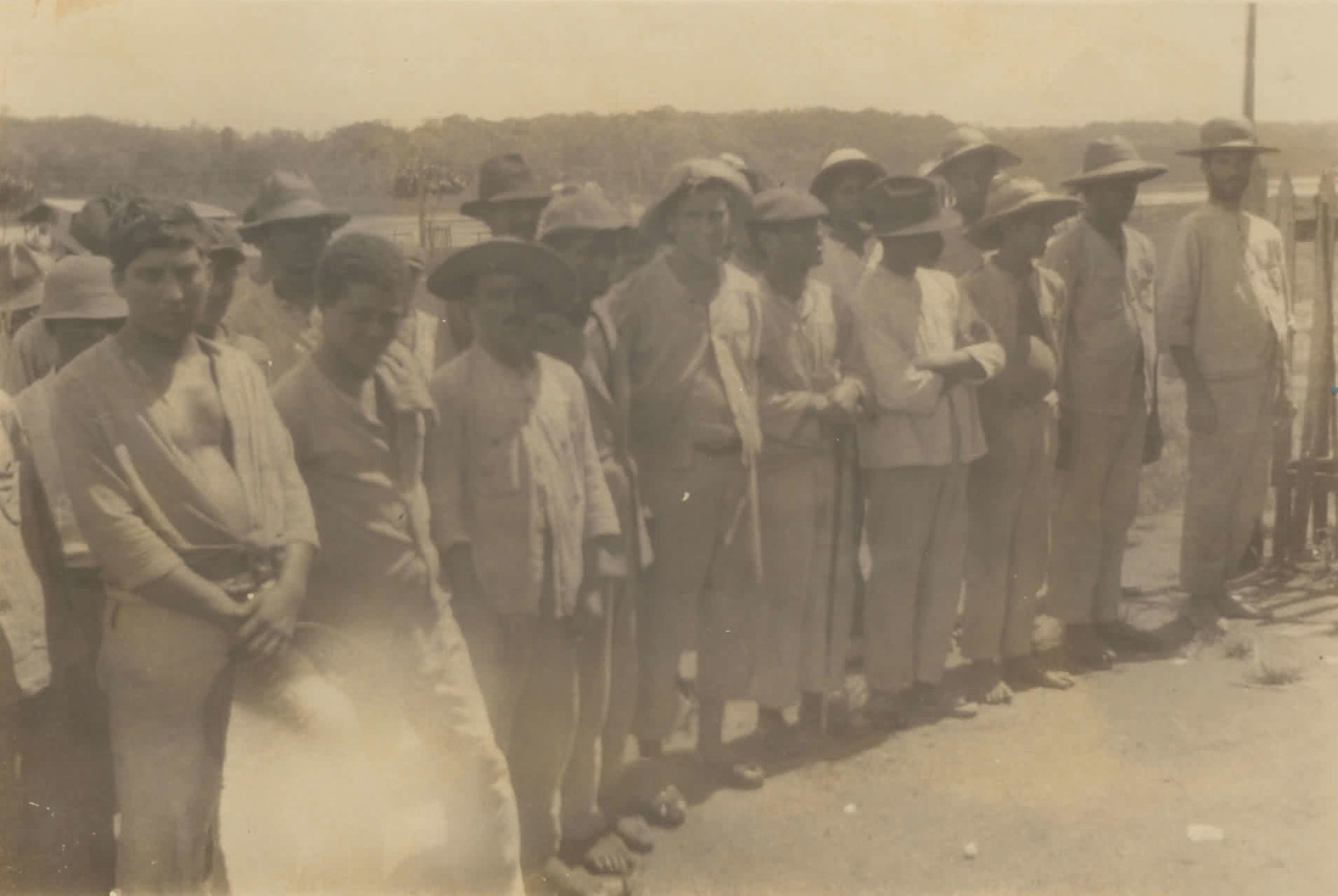
A group of sick prisoners

A former Public Force soldier reported how in the morning prisoners were forced to gather the bodies of their comrades who died during the night. The number of deaths was five per day and reached twelve at its peak, according to Lauro Nicácio, and the "cemetery group" went to the hospital at dawn to check the number of deaths. He attributed the illnesses to the lack of a balanced diet. Carlo Romani highlighted the unsanitary conditions and the insufficiency of medicine and medical staff. Treatments at the Simão Lopes Hospital were limited to quinine tablets or injections. The hospital administered 120 injections per day with just two needles, which became blunt with intensive use, causing ulcers and edema in the patients' skin. The one hundred beds in the hospital and 88 in the infirmary, nicknamed the "death ward", were not enough, and many patients waited outside for a place. Some died in their shelters. According to Domingos Braz, "Oiapoque is a place without medical resources", where "hygienic and sanitary precepts themselves are unknown".

For the newspaper A Noite, "Bernardes had found a legal way of extermination, without the need to resort to the guillotine and rifle". Carlo Romani characterized the place as a concentration camp, to which prisoners were deliberately sent to die. Paulo Sérgio Pinheiro used this nomenclature, unofficially, and Alexandre Samis avoided it, preferring the term "penal colony". The Artur Bernardes Archive itself uses "concentration camp"; however, before the advent of Nazism, the term "concentration camp" did not have the connotation of a planned extermination camp.

The story of a prisoner, sentenced to death, who was allegedly amnestied after singing on the edge of a grave, remained in local popular memory:

Goodbye Oyapock River,
sepulcher of the unfortunate
when hearing my prayers
even the stones curse each other.
I no longer see my mother,
because I lack freedom.
How sad it is to miss you.
How sad it is to miss you.

=== Escapes ===
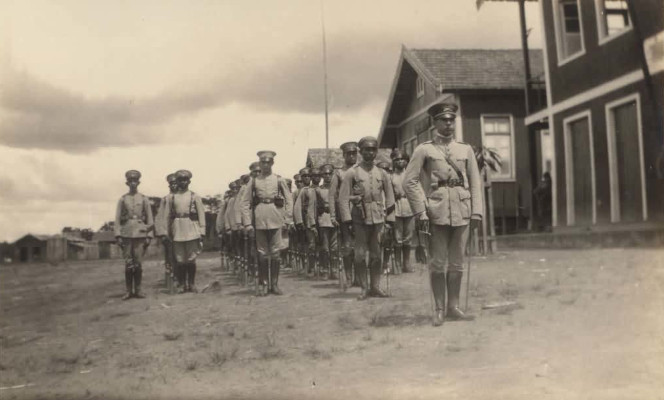
Army detachment in the colony

The contingent of guards was too small for the colony's vast perimeter, which was easy to escape. The jungle itself was the biggest obstacle. According to Domingos Braz, most escapes occurred through group planning. The first to flee was worker Pedro Carneiro, on 17 February 1925, but he did so on his own. Carneiro arrived in Belém and from there went to Rio de Janeiro, where he raised 300 thousand réis for his comrades in Clevelândia. Crossing the jungle exhausted many prisoners, and some of those who arrived at Saint George, in French Guiana, died due to lack of medicine. By June 1925, the previous escapes had made the administration more alert. According to Lauro Nicácio, any suspicion of an escape plan led to beatings, and several fishermen were arrested and had their boats confiscated. The last escape of militants occurred in the early hours of 11 to 12 December 1925.

Domingos Braz's letter followed the fate of a group of anarchist leaders until September 1925: six were alive under arrest, four had died and another four had escaped. The number of fugitives, including Domingos himself, would still grow. They had difficulty finding jobs and several died on French territory. Domingos and others managed to reach Belém, Biófilo Panclastro managed to reach Cayenne and leave by canoe for Colombia and the bricklayer José Batista da Silva, from the Union of Workers in Civil Construction, delved into the jungle, a trip considered impossible by the local population, and reappeared in Belém.

== Deactivation ==
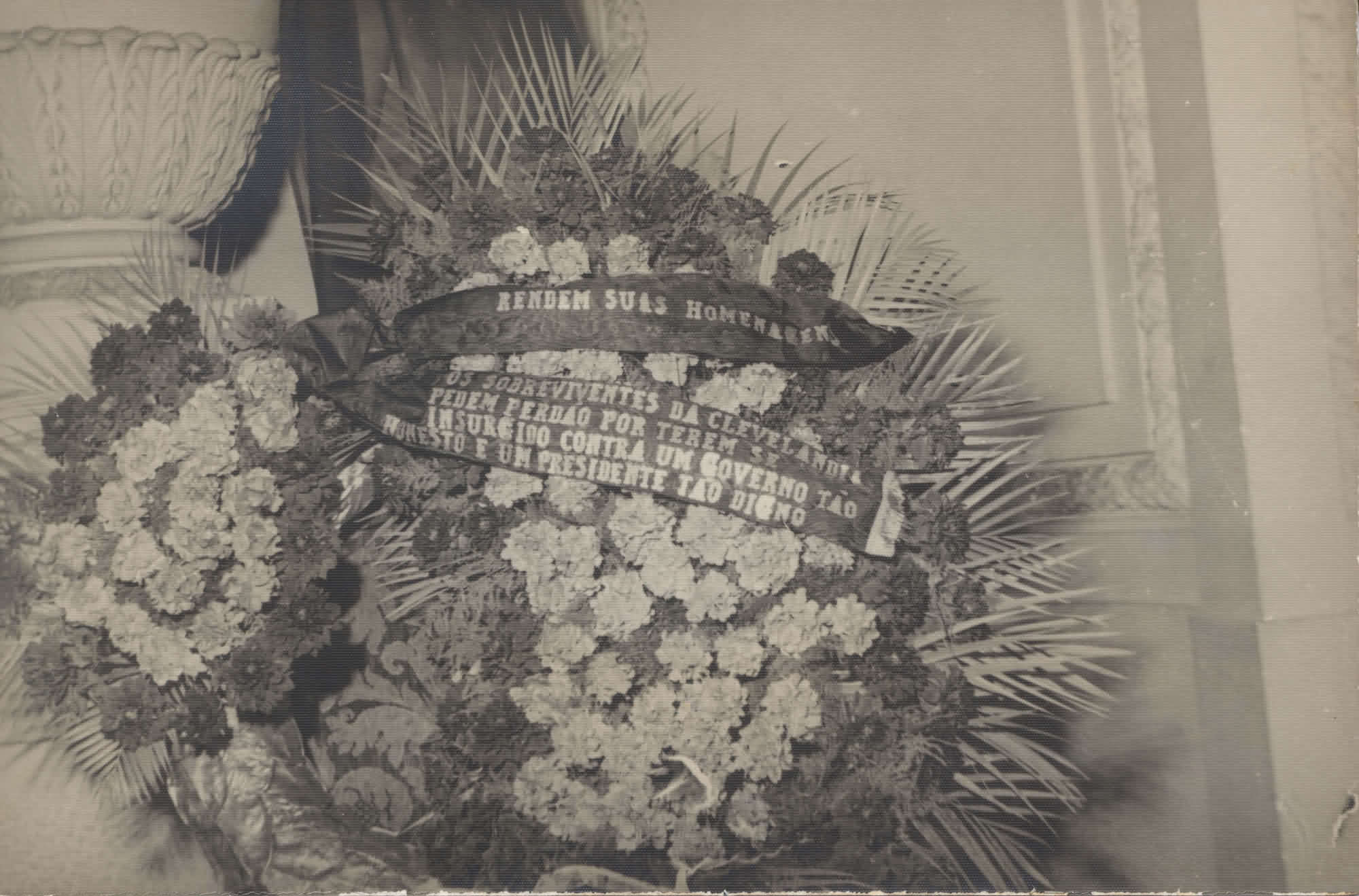
At Artur Bernardes' funeral in 1955, "the survivors of Clevelândia ask for forgiveness for having rebelled against such an honest government and such a worthy president"

The Washington Luís administration, which had succeeded Artur Bernardes, ordered the release of the prisoners in 1927. On 14 January, O Combate reported a new wave of deportees to Clevelândia aboard the steamship Vasconcellos, but on 25 January it published that the prisoners had been amnestied. The last disembarkation of Clevelândia prisoners in Rio de Janeiro, according to the newspaper, was on 22 February 1927, aboard the steamship Macapá. According to the testimony of these prisoners, others remained in Clevelândia due to their health condition. The topic occupied the front page of newspapers for the first three months of 1927. The communist Octávio Brandão, a witness to the prisoners' arrival, saw yellowish, thin and weak survivors, with diseased livers and swollen feet.

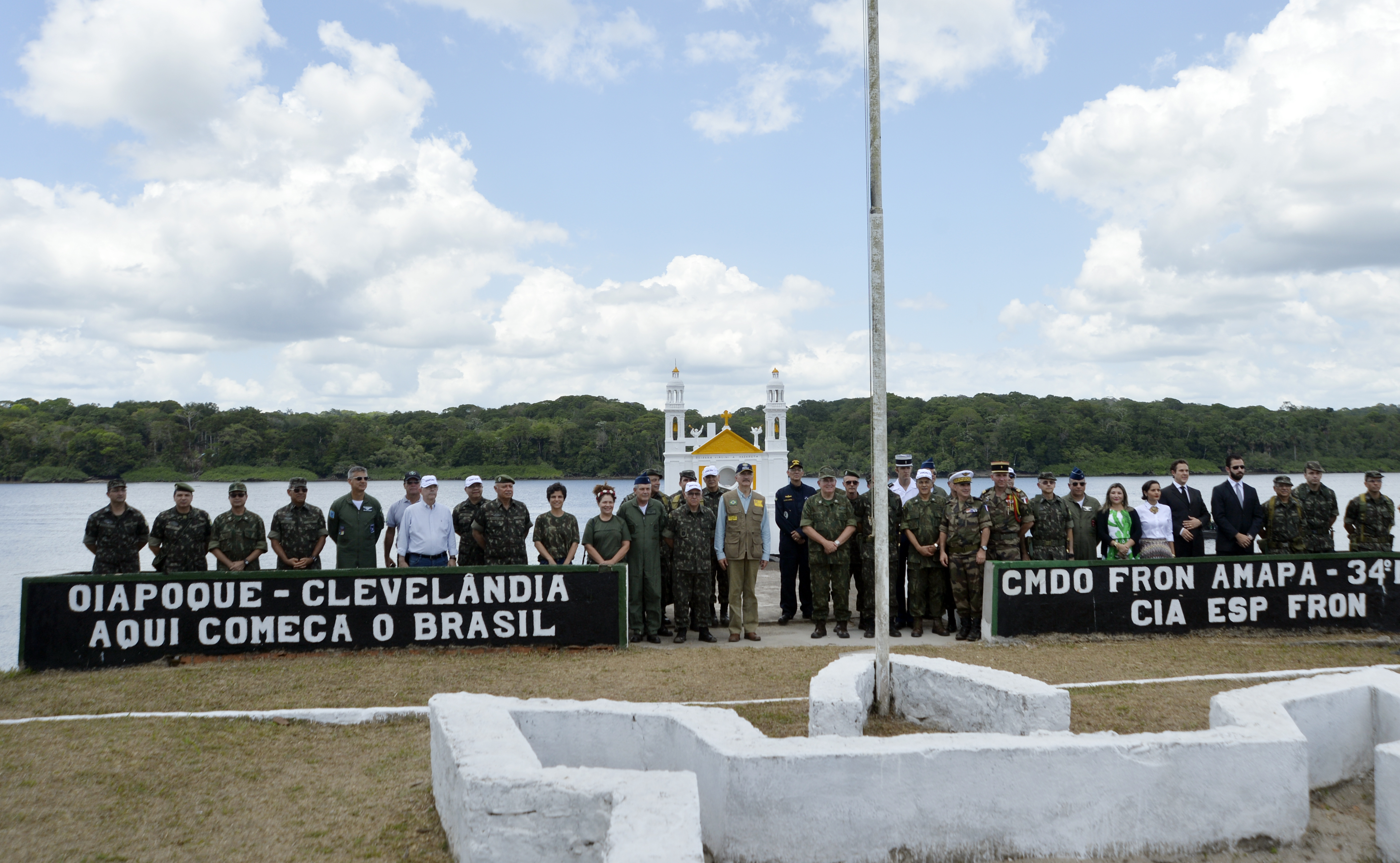
Military authorities in Clevelândia in 2015

Artur Bernardes earned the nickname "Clevelândia President" and remained associated with the penal colony. At his funeral, in 1955, a wreath was left with the words: "The survivors of Clevelândia ask for forgiveness for having risen up against such an honest government and such a worthy president", a possible irony on the part of his detractors.

Some of the prisoners integrated into the local community and have descendants in the current population of Clevelândia. The town of Martinica expanded continuously, was renamed Oiapoque and in 1945 became the seat of a new independent municipality. The Cleveland Colonial Center was extinguished in 1936 and its assets were transferred to the Ministry of War, which transformed Clevelândia into a military colony in 1940. The location currently hosts the Special Border Company of the 34th Jungle Infantry Battalion. There is no visible material legacy of the penal colony, apart from possible burials in the São Carlos cemetery. The Army's closed archive in Clevelândia holds documents from various periods, including those from the penal colony.

== See also ==
- Amapá Question
