= Academic battalion =

Portuguese and Brazilian military units

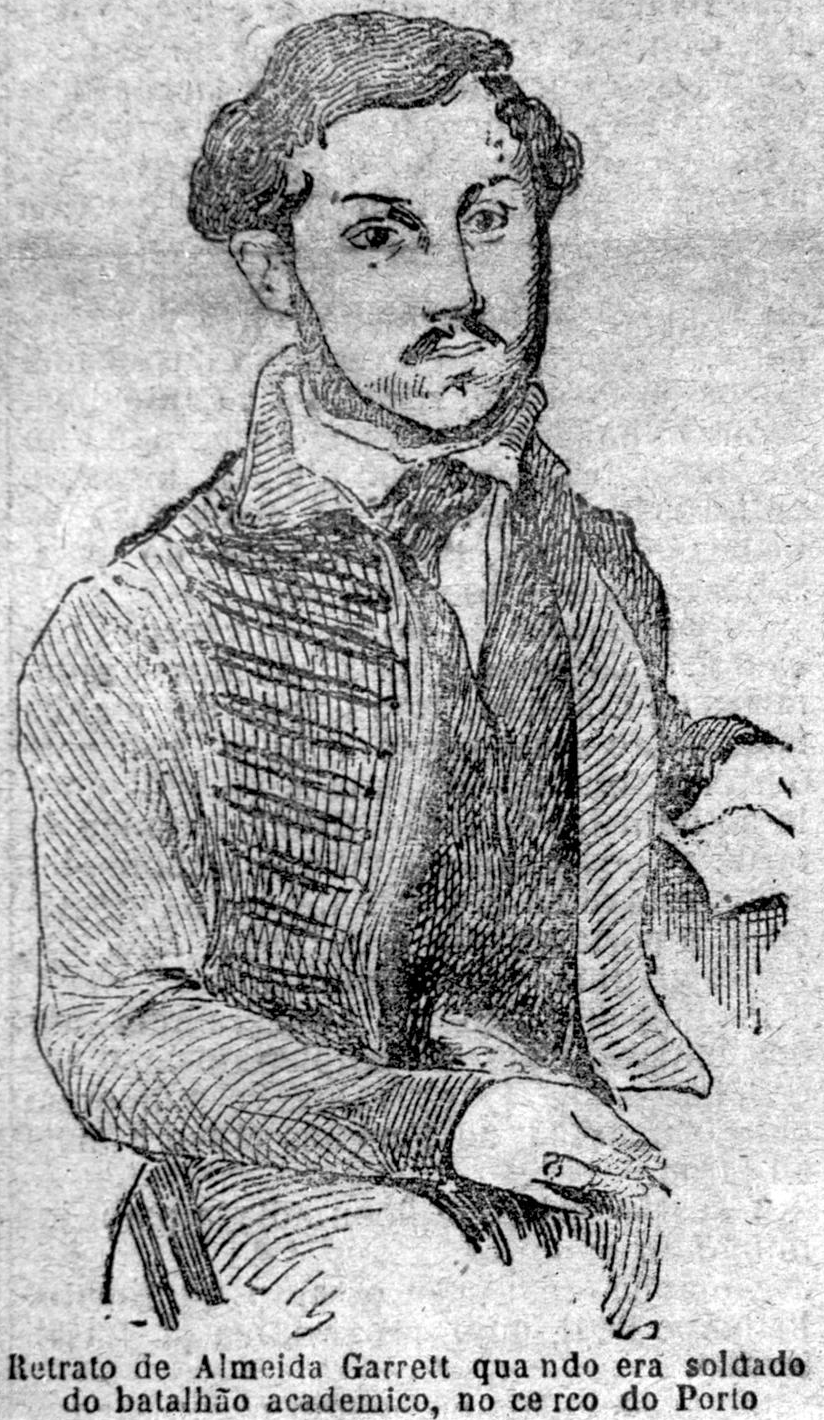
A drawing of Almeida Garrett when he was a soldier of an academic battalion during the Siege of Porto, Liberal Wars

An academic battalion (Portuguese: batalhão académico) is a type of military unit formed by university students and lecturers, in the scope of the histories of Portugal and Brazil. The first of such units was formed in 1808, within the University of Coimbra, to fight the French invaders, during the Peninsular War. This original academic battalion would inspire the creation of latter similar units, both in Portugal and in Brazil.

== List of historical academic battalions ==
1. Academic Battalion of the University of Coimbra (known as the "Academic Battalion of 1808") – formed in 1808 with teachers and professors of the University of Coimbra. It participated in several military operations of the Peninsular War;
2. Academic Volunteers Battalion – formed in 1826 in Coimbra, to support the Liberal forces that were fighting the absolutists;
3. Academic Battalion (known as the "Academic Battalion of 1828") – formed in Coimbra in 1828, in the scope of the Liberal Wars (1828–1834). It fought on the side of the Liberal army against the Miguelites;
4. Academic Battalion (known as the "Academic Battalion of 1846") – formed in 1846, in the scope of the Portuguese civil conflicts known as the Patuleia. It supported the Septembrists against the Cartists led by the Duke of Saldanha;
5. Academic Battalion (known as the "Academic Battalion of the Paraguayan War") – formed in Brazil in the scope of the Paraguayan War, being integrated in the corps of Fatherland Volunteers (Voluntários da Pátria);
6. Academic Battalion (known as the "Academic Battalion of the Revolta da Armada") – formed in Brazil in the scope of the Revolta da Armada (Naval revolt);
7. Academic battalions – three academic battalions formed, respectively, in Lisbon, Coimbra and Oporto, in 1919, in the scope of the Monarchic Revolution and civil conflict that led to the establishment of the Monarchy of the North. The academic battalions of Lisbon and Coimbra aligned on the Republican side, while the battalion of Oporto aligned on the Monarchic side.

== See also ==
- Patriotic battalions
