= Patriotic battalions =

Paramilitary forces in Brasil

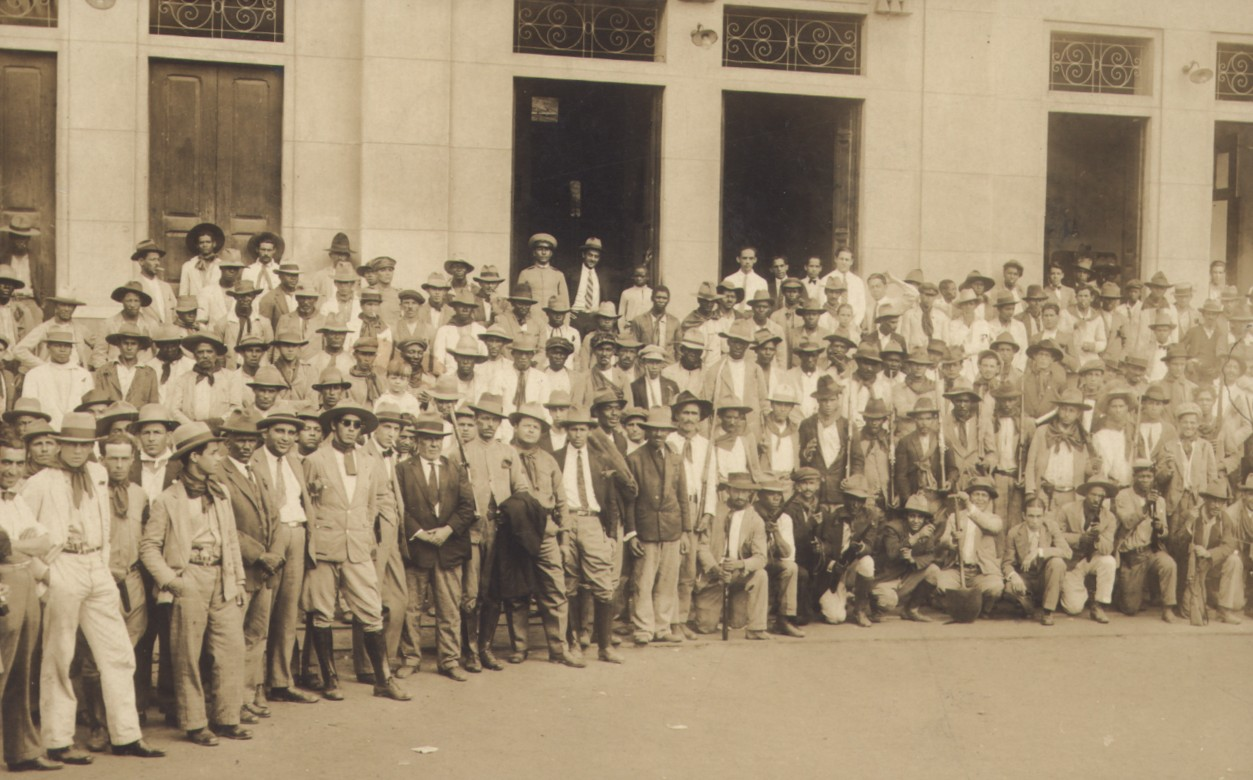
Minas Gerais volunteers in the Revolution of 1930

In Brazil's military history, patriotic battalions (Portuguese: batalhões patrióticos) were irregular paramilitary forces, usually made up of civilian volunteers, mobilized in times of crisis. They were created by local chiefs and could be paid by the chiefs or by the government. Their combat effectiveness was variable. The battalions of the countryside colonels were not adapted to conventional warfare, artillery and, outside of the Pampas, cavalry. On the other hand, they were effective in a typically Brazilian and hinterland guerrilla.

== History ==
Their origins date back to the black troops of Henrique Dias and indigenous troops of Filipe Camarão in the Pernambuco Insurrection, during the 17th century. Patriotic battalions fought in the Brazilian War of Independence (1822–1825). In Bahia, the whole society took part in the fight. In the following decades, "patriotic battalions" participated in the Bahia Independence Festival, in Salvador, similar to Carnival blocks. Patriotic battalions of radical republicans, the "Jacobins", proliferated in Rio de Janeiro during the government of Floriano Peixoto (1891–1894). They belonged to the Ministry of War and were led by army officers. Their social composition was heterogeneous and different from the colonels' battalions; there was even an elite Academic Battalion. The formation of battalions was notable in Southern Brazil. The federal government resorted to colonels' battalions during its persecution of the Prestes Column, distributing a large number of modern weapons. Even the bandits of Virgulino Ferreira da Silva, known as "Lampião", were incorporated. They were a way of decentralizing loyalist forces in difficult-to-access regions, such as the hinterlands of Ceará. Both sides in the Revolution of 1930 resorted to patriotic battalions.

Other irregular forces during this period included the "provisional corps" that assisted the police in Rio Grande do Sul, bandit troops, as in the cangaço, and foreign immigrant battalions in the 1924 São Paulo Revolt. The Brazilian Army was not the only land force in the country, as there was also the National Guard, until 1918, and the "small state armies", the Public Forces. One of the battalions' forms was as pawns and henchmen of local political bosses, allowing them to harass subordinates, opponents and the army. Armed groups of colonels such as Floro Bartolomeu, Franklin de Albuquerque and Antônio Ramos Caiado were common. Private militias were a pillar of their power. In the form of patriotic battalions, they continued the role of the National Guard in the countryside. Their mobilization in the 1920s has been described as "a last sprout of the militias of the ancien régime". The existence of these militias affronted the authority of regular police and military forces, but they represented powerful political interests. The gradual strengthening of the army, expanding thanks to conscription (the Sortition Law), and political centralization after the 1930 Revolution led to the weakening of these colonels.

== See also ==
- Voluntários da Pátria
- Academic battalion
