= Ibrahim de Almeida Nobre =

Brazilian activist

Ibrahim Nobre
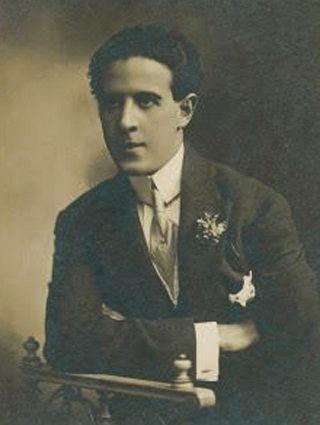
- Born: February 19, 1888; São Paulo, São Paulo (state), Empire of Brazil
- Died: April 9, 1970 (aged 82); São Paulo, São Paulo (state), Brazil
- Education: Faculty of Law of São Paulo
- Occupations: Public prosecutor, lawyer, journalist

Ibrahim de Almeida Nobre (February 19, 1888 – April 9, 1970) was a Brazilian jurist, orator, journalist, and writer. He is best remembered for his role as an agitator in the Constitutionalist Revolution, which earned him the epithet ''Tribune of the Revolution''.

== Biography ==
Born in São Paulo, Nobre graduated from the Faculty of Law of São Paulo in 1909, becoming a police commissioner in Salesópolis, where he helped control outbreaks of the Spanish flu. He was then appointed as a commissioner in Santos and later promoted to public prosecutor in his hometown.

During the Revolution of 1930, Nobre opposed the provisional government that had overthrown president Washington Luís, delivering in 1931 an enthusiastic speech against the policies of Getúlio Vargas, who ordered his arrest.

Amid the economic and political crisis that afflicted the state of São Paulo, whose rural elites saw themselves deprived of their former power, Nobre adhered to the constitutionalist movement, which demanded the draft of a new constitution to limit the powers of the newly-established regime, led by Vargas. Nobre had a major role in rallying people to the cause, mobilizing the masses through his speeches. With the onset of the civil war, Nobre enlisted as a soldier in a volunteer battalion that bore his name.

Following the defeat of the constitutionalist movement, Nobre was arrested again, and shared his cell with important figures of the revolution, including the poet Guilherme de Almeida and the journalist Júlio de Mesquita Filho. He was subsequently exiled to Portugal.
