= Public Forces (Brazil) =

Defunct Brazilian states paramilitaries

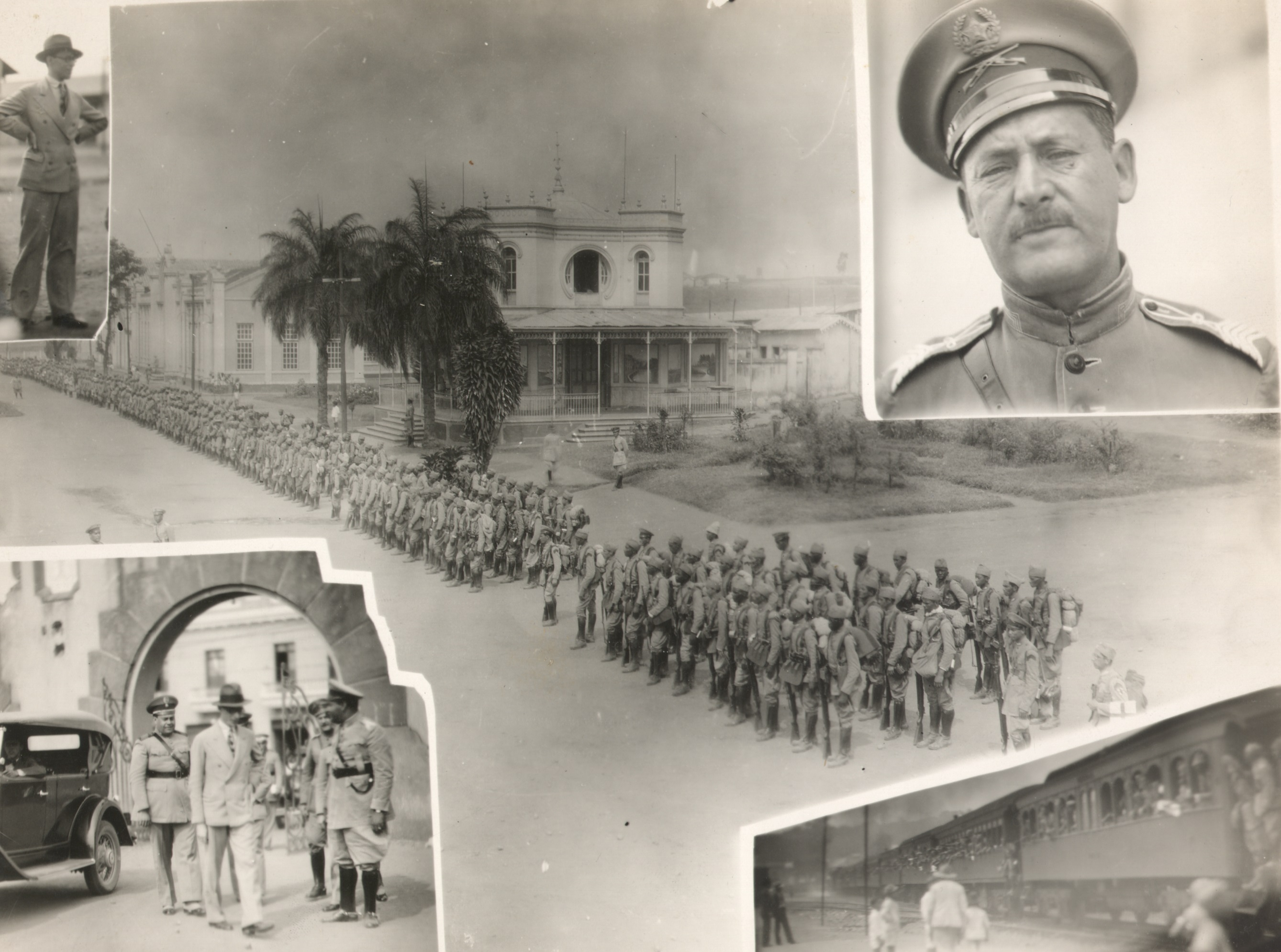
Soldiers of the Public Force of Minas Gerais being inspected by Gustavo Capanema before embarking on a train to the front during the Constitutionalist Revolution of 1932

The Public Forces (Portuguese: Forças Públicas) of the states of Brazil were already called "small state armies" in the First Brazilian Republic (1889–1930) due to their martial character. They took part in the various struggles and rebellions of the period alongside, and sometimes against, the Brazilian Army. Their character was hybrid, police and warfare. They emerged in the federalism of the First Republic as shields of state power against central power, represented by the Army, and were dismantled by the federal government in the Vargas Era (1930–1945) onwards, losing their conventional warfare capabilities.

The Brazilian Empire already had militarized police forces, but its provinces were not autonomous. Only in the Republic did state presidents (governors) need military forces in their relations with each other and with the Union. By preventing federal intervention and securing the authority of state oligarchies, they strengthened the First Republic's political system. By 1920, half the states had militias larger than the federal army garrisons. The three most important, São Paulo, Minas Gerais and Rio Grande do Sul, had the strongest "small armies". The largest, the Public Force of São Paulo, was prestigious; it hired a French training mission years before the Brazilian Army and had artillery and aviation. The poorer states had modest forces. The federal army, in turn, was still small and weak at the turn of the century. The existence of Public Forces, National Guard and "patriotic battalions" meant the federal army was not the only land military force, a situation condemned by many of its officers. In case of a foreign war the Public Forces would increase Brazilian power, but they could also obstruct Brazil's international power projection.

After the Revolution of 1930 and especially in the Estado Novo (1937–1945), Getúlio Vargas promoted political centralization and the Army realized its ambition of hegemony over the security forces. Central power controlled state forces and expropriated their heavy weapons. The new role of the Military Police, as the Public Forces became known, was that of auxiliary and reserve forces for the Army. Even after 1945, when centralization was not so great, their focus gradually shifted from conventional warfare to public order. At the time of the 1961 Legality Campaign and the 1964 coup d'état, they still had a bellicose character. Several, notably the Military Brigade of Rio Grande do Sul and the Military Police of Minas Gerais, prepared for combat, which did not occur, against the Armed Forces, which now had much greater firepower. The Brazilian military dictatorship (1964–1985) confirmed the Army's control over the police.

== Reasons for militarization ==
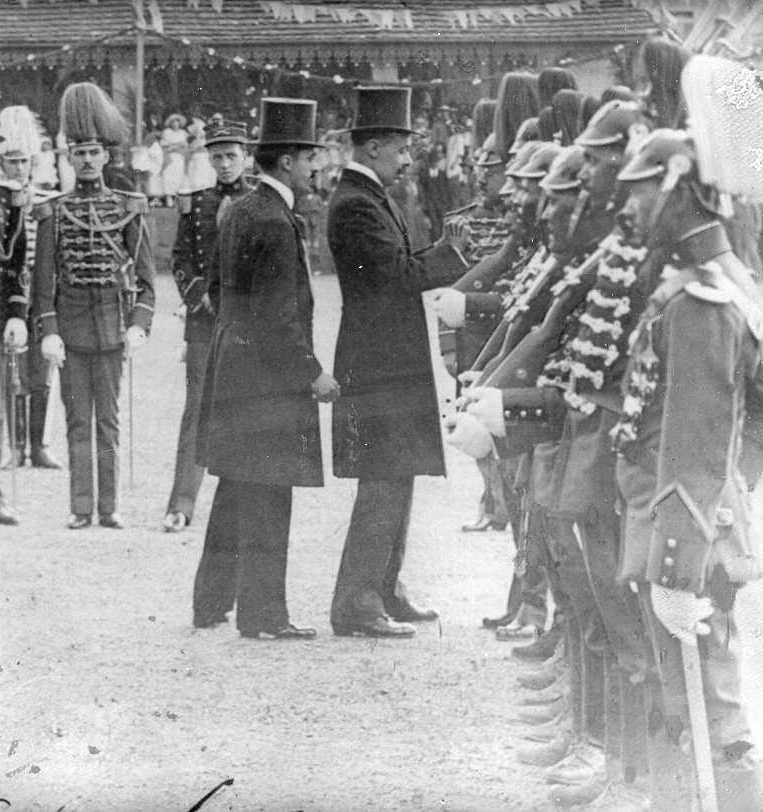
The president of Paraná decorating his Public Force in 1915

The political system in the First Brazilian Republic left extensive powers in the hands of state oligarchies and municipal coronelism. The power of São Paulo and Minas Gerais, the milk coffee policy, was preponderant. The 1891 Constitution had federalism as its principle and allowed states to negotiate with each other and to legislate on any matter that had not been denied them—including the organization of military forces. Even in the 1920s, there was still no national consciousness, and state identities were strong.

The Army, one of the armed branches of the central power, was on the verge of collapse in the late 1890s. It was small, unprepared and of little operational capacity. It was divorced from the civilian elites, especially in São Paulo and Minas Gerais, and was not yet a "national organization capable of effectively planning and executing a defense policy in its broadest sense". It gradually approached this ambition over the period. The political system left a secondary role to the Army, which should solve what the local forces could not handle. There was still theoretically the National Guard, and in times of crisis local colonels mobilized "patriotic battalions" with their peons and henchmen. Thus, there were armed troops other than the Army.

Since the Empire, police had already served as a kind of Army reserve, participating in the Paraguayan War and internal conflicts. However, the imperial provinces were not autonomous and did not need military force to relate to each other and to the central power. Policing was local and largely the responsibility of the National Guard. Only in the Republic did the presidents of the states (governors) build their small armies, capable of rivaling the federal army, in the midst of tensions with the Union.

At the behest of state oligarchies, the police maintained state influence in national politics, prevented federal intervention, and preserved the governors' policy and the political system of the First Republic. Since the Empire they already had the rigor of hierarchy and discipline, becoming even more militarized in the Republic. Even so, public safety was still one of their duties, and the character of the force was hybrid, both military and police. Within the states, the Public Forces served as praetorian guards for the groups in power and could be used against internal enemies.

In 1909, Albuquerque Lins, then president of São Paulo, defined his Public Force as a "small army of São Paulo", and before him other observers already noticed the phenomenon. Journalist João Camilo de Oliveira Torres wrote of the existence of "a National Army and two dozen state armies". Another term used was "state militia". The official denomination of "Public Force" was not standard in all states and times, and in Rio Grande do Sul the name "Military Brigade" remained.

== Capabilities of the forces ==
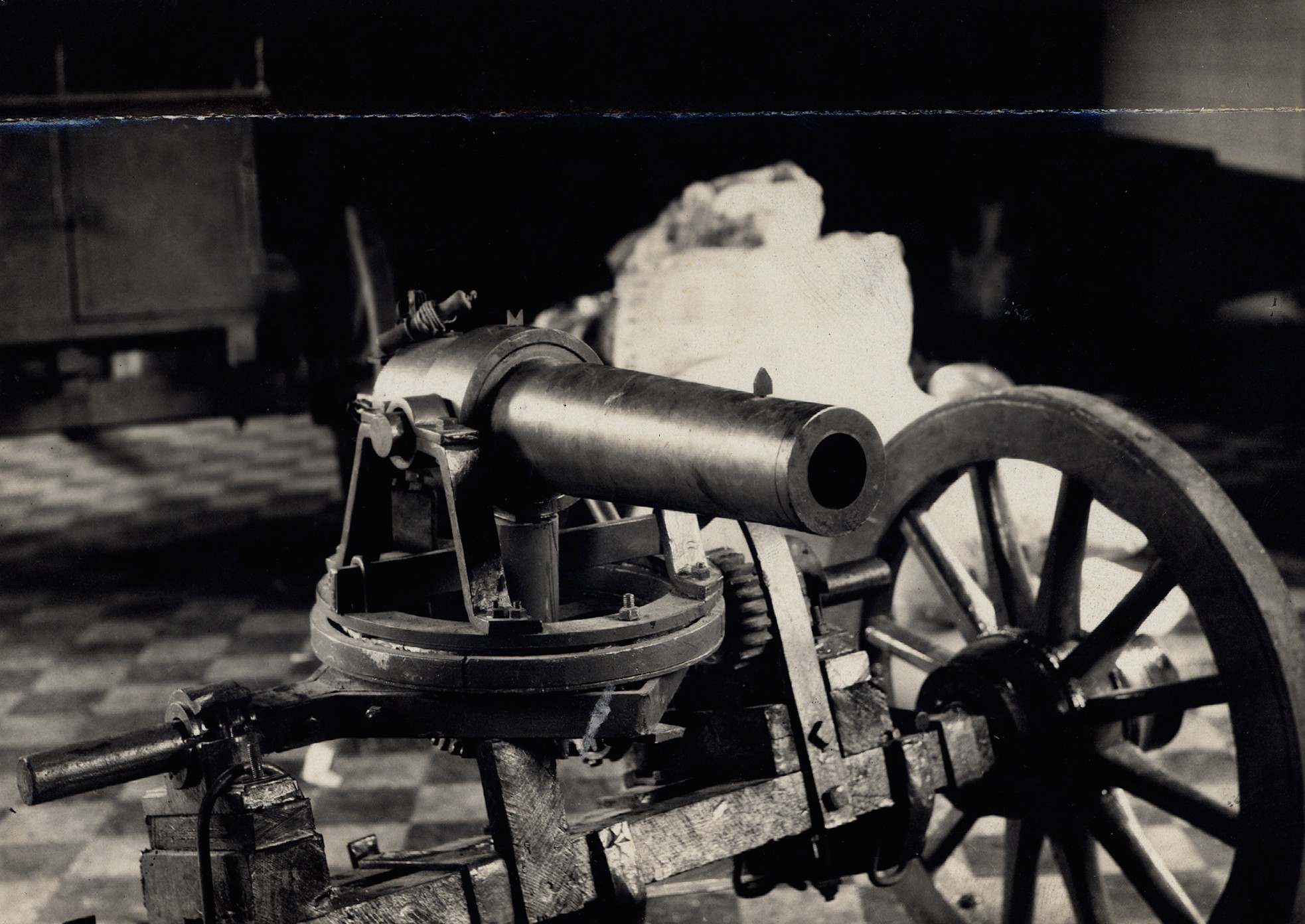

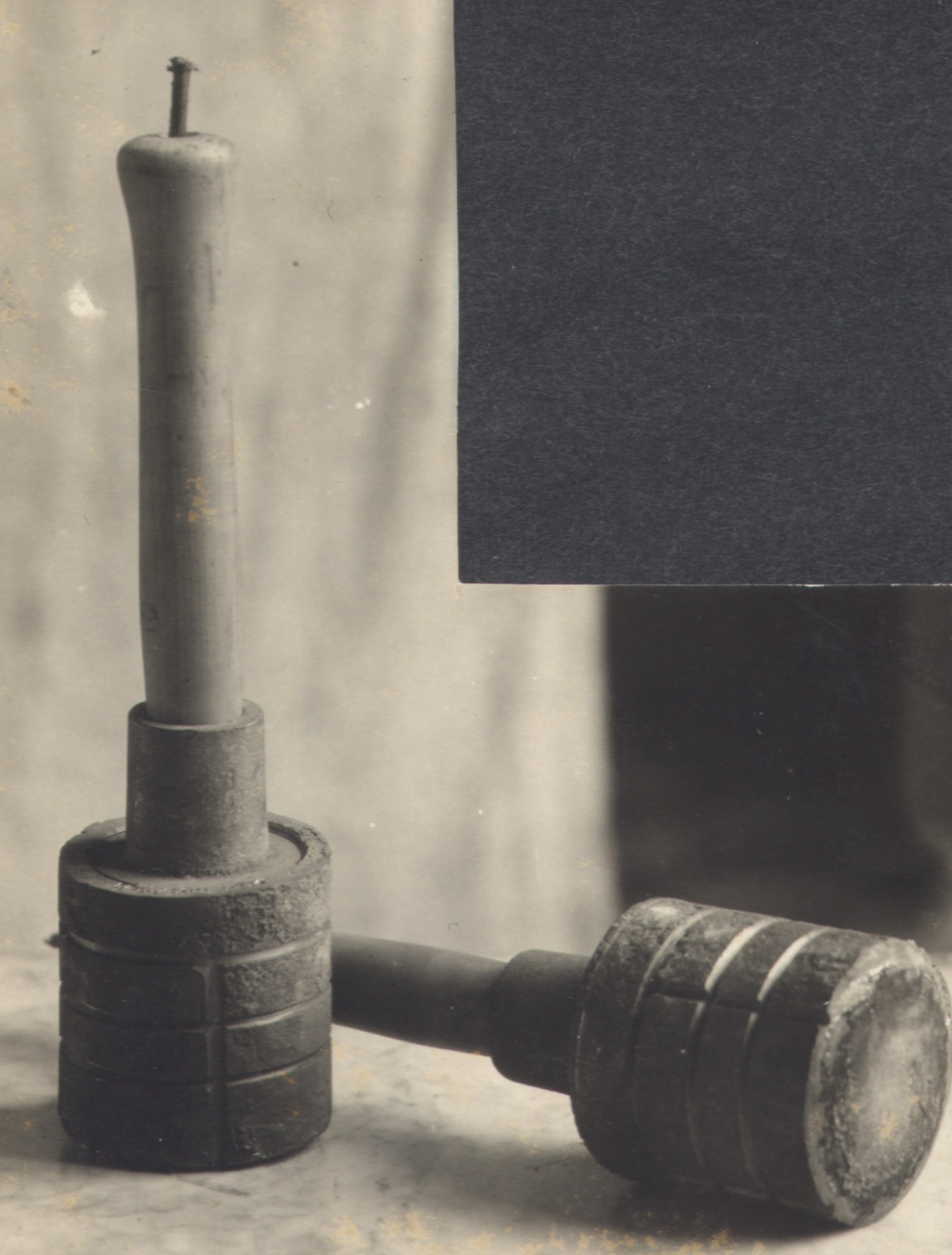
Cannon and hand grenades manufactured for the Public Force of Minas Gerais in 1930 (Note: See Bastos, Expedito Carlos Stephani (9 August 2004). "Revolução de 1930: armamentos produzidos em Belo Horizonte". ECSB Defesa.)

=== National panorama ===
In 1926 state forces had an authorized strength of 39,516 men, but U.S. military intelligence estimated the actual number at 45,821. Meanwhile, in mid-1925, the Federal Army had 36,000 soldiers and 3,045 officers. The strongest states would have a formidable army if they faced the federal government. By 1920, police outnumbered federal troops in half the states, including Bahia, Pernambuco, and São Paulo; in 1930, Minas Gerais was also in this group. For neighboring countries, state forces were reserve armies, making Brazil more militarized than it claimed to be at international conferences. However, state power prevented the Brazilian government from effectively projecting its influence across borders.

State and federal troops in 1920
State	Police	Army
Acre	347	79
Amazonas	347	394
Alagoas	1.064	428
Bahia	3.019	1.545
Ceará	858	657
Federal District	3.987	11.236
Espírito Santo	289	703
Goiás	483	222
Maranhão	399	756
Mato Grosso	734	1.116
Minas Gerais	2.874	3.787
Pará	827	1.418
Paraíba	1.061	409
Paraná	670	2.581
Pernambuco	1.402	706
Piauí	371	514
Rio de Janeiro	694	2.241
Rio Grande do Norte	535	170
Rio Grande do Sul	2.052	9.034
Santa Catarina	589	727
São Paulo	7.538	3.675
Sergipe	422	254

The Public Forces participated intensely in conflicts and revolts. In the 1924 São Paulo Revolt, police contingents from Rio Grande do Sul to Bahia converged in the city of São Paulo. In the subsequent Paraná Campaign (1924–1925), loyalist colonel Cândido Rondon preferred to use police against tenentist rebels, as army officers might sympathize with their peers among the rebels.

The combat capabilities of the militias depended a lot on the financial conditions of their respective states: São Paulo was powerful, while states like Paraná, Santa Catarina and Bahia had more modest forces. The largest Public Force was in São Paulo, but Minas Gerais, Rio Grande do Sul and Bahia also had large numbers. The three strongest states (São Paulo, Minas Gerais and Rio Grande do Sul) had the most prominent police forces. Bahia and Pernambuco were mentioned by Ruy Barbosa as capable of facing the Union in 1898, but they do not appear as having "small armies" in the historiography. There is disagreement over whether all states had "small armies" or just the strongest ones.

=== Specific forces ===
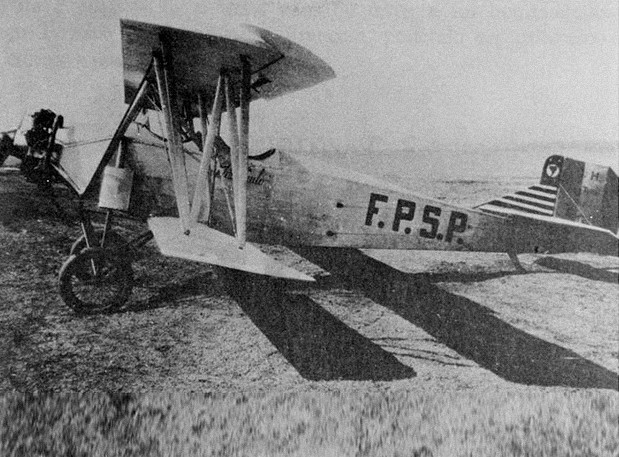
Public Force of São Paulo's aviation aircraft

From 1891, with the Army's threat to federalism, São Paulo politicians developed their military force. The usefulness of militarization was not unanimous and it was questioned in the press and in parliamentary debates. The force fluctuated between martial and police priorities until the dominance of the martial from 1901 onwards. It took the lead over the Federal Army in the creation of preparatory schools for officers and soldiers and in the hiring of a French military instruction mission, obtained in 1906 for São Paulo and only in 1919 for the Federal Army. From a strength of eight infantry companies in 1891, with 2,267 men, it grew to 14,254 in 1926. By 1927 it was organized into seven infantry battalions, two cavalry regiments, a fire battalion, and an aviation squadron. In addition to the incipient aviation, it had artillery, exceeding the Army's 2nd Military Region in numbers, firepower and operability.

The officers of the Public Force of São Paulo (FPSP) were prestigious. It was "a symbol and pride of the Republican Party of São Paulo", accumulating a reputation of invincibility in the 1920s. This was due more to bragging rights and propaganda than to reality. It "was tactically insurmountable, well equipped, with a large number of troops, fierce and excellently trained", but it suffered several defeats against the revolutionary tenentists, who generally had better leadership. Many of its officers joined tenentism, notably Miguel Costa.

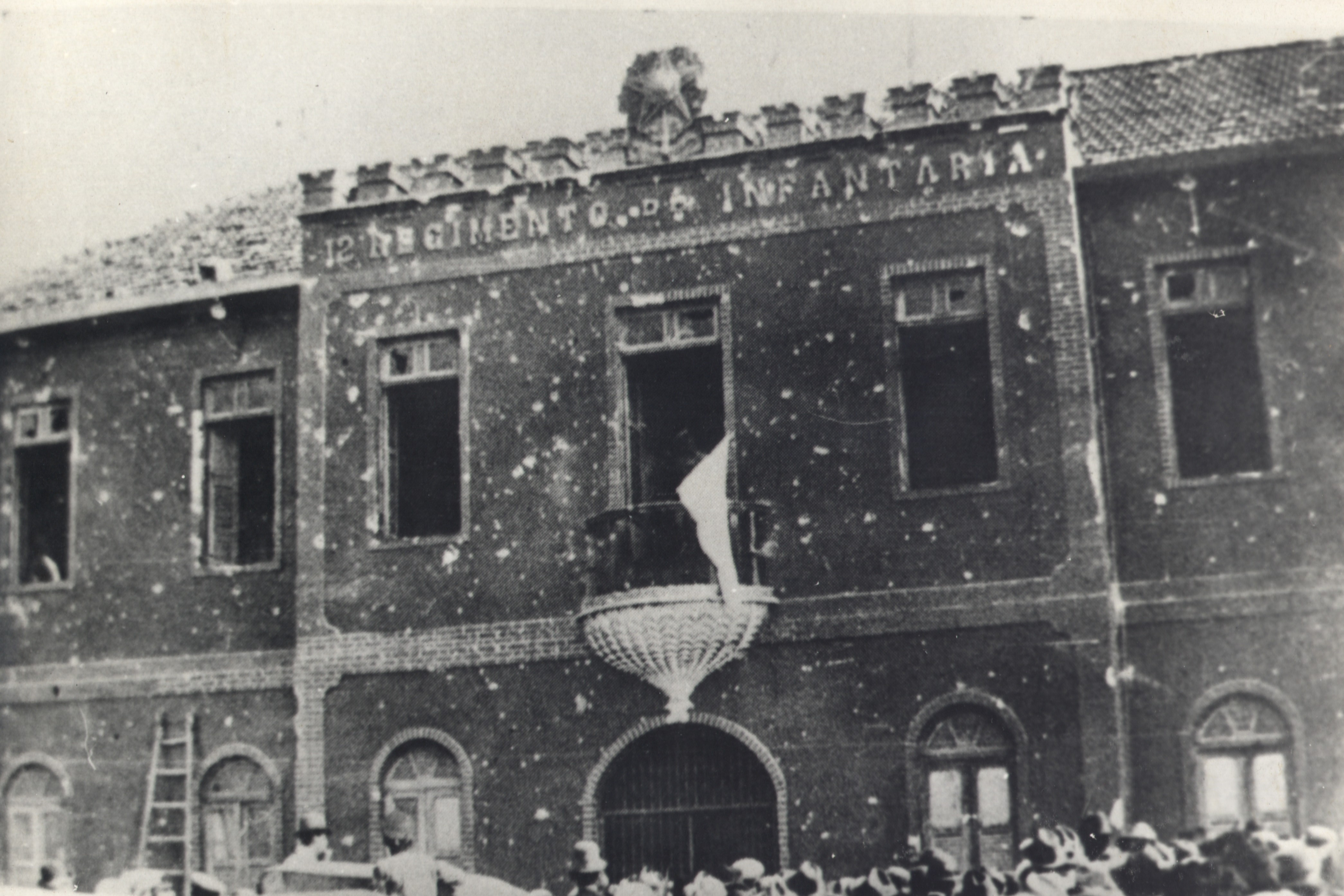
Headquarters of the 12th Infantry Regiment of the Brazilian Army defeated by Minas Gerais troops in 1930

The Military Brigade of Rio Grande do Sul had a martial focus since the beginning of the Republic and did little police activity. It was well armed, although without an artillery corps, and had more military experience than the FPSP. Rio Grande do Sul had a militarized culture and a strong army presence. An Instructor Mission of the National Army, active from 1909, kept the Brigade up-to-date along federal lines. Its strength varied from 1,500 to 3,200 men in the First Republic. In 1895, an enemy of president Júlio de Castilhos calculated that he could mobilize from seven to eight thousand men through provisional bodies and municipal guards.

The Public Force of Minas Gerais was inferior to that of São Paulo in size, training, and organization, and there was no equivalent to the French training mission. It also had its defeats in the 1920s, but in the 1930 Revolution, poorly armed and with a staff of about 5,000 men, it emerged victorious when facing the federal garrison of the 4th Military Region and fronts with all neighboring states.

The Public Force of Pará defeated the tenentists in 1924 and 1930. After 1930, lieutenant Magalhães Barata came to power and extinguished the force, but had to revive it in 1932 to face a constitutionalist revolt in Óbidos. The Pernambuco Police Regiment had the structure of an army, but it was not even capable of defeating the cangaço. In Mato Grosso, a state of minor importance and financially dependent on the federal government, the Army garrison outnumbered the Public Force.

== Dismantling by the central power ==
State armies were the "great military issue bequeathed by the First Republic". Without even internal military control, the Army could not realize its role of national defense. The problem was not resolved until after the First Republic. For decades, Army officers feared state police as threats to national integrity and the Army itself. The issue was discussed in the magazine A Defesa Nacional and even presented as a separatist risk. The subordination of these forces to the central power was carried out over the decades by the joint action of the Army and the federal government.

=== Before 1930 ===
Mandatory military service, implemented based on the Sortition Law in 1916, allowed for the physical expansion of the Army. The federal garrisons in São Paulo and Minas Gerais, respectively in the 2nd and 4th Military Regions, were reinforced in 1919. The Public Forces also reacted by expanding their numbers, but the Army's growth momentum was maintained in the following decades. In the long run the vast expansion of their numerical presence, thanks to the military lottery, strengthened central power at the expense of local and regional plutocracies.

The first step towards federal control over the Public Forces came in 1917. With the consent of the governors, the militarized police would become auxiliaries of the Army. Its hierarchy would be equivalent to that of the Army (but without any rank above lieutenant colonel), with gradual and successive ascension. If governors did not agree, their state military would be subject to mandatory military service in the Army. Central control over the police increased, but their militarization along the lines of the Army was also accentuated, as there was an intention to use them as a war force.

=== After 1930 ===
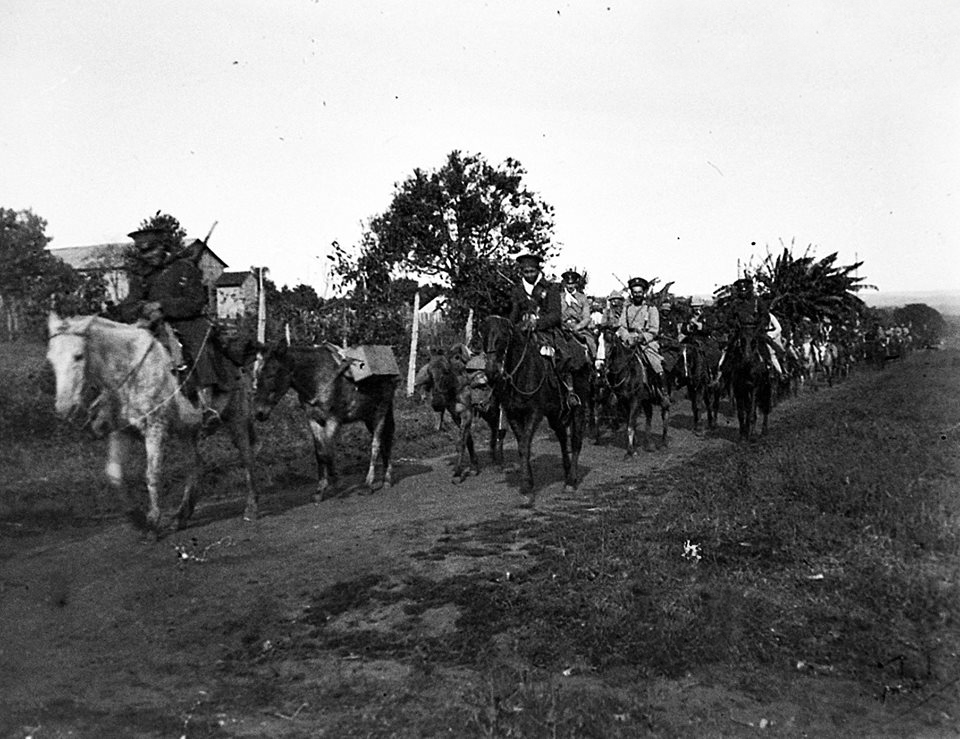
Rio Grande do Sul cavalry passing through Itararé in 1932

After the 1930 Revolution, state military forces were a threat to the new regime. In 1931, the State Interventors' Code weakened state governments, limited spending on their forces and their quantity of arms and ammunition, and prohibited them from having artillery and aviation. In power, Getúlio Vargas promoted political centralization and the dismantling of state war apparatuses, especially after the participation of the Public Force of São Paulo in the Constitutionalist Revolution of 1932 against his government. Vargas' own Provisional Government used police forces from 18 states against São Paulo. The political centralization, which demanded this dismantling, was already defended since the last decade by the revolutionary tenentists.

To carry out the 1937 coup d'état, Vargas had to neutralize or ally himself with the police. In the subsequent authoritarian regime, the Estado Novo (1937–1945), Vargas attempted to control regional elites, appointing interventors in place of governors, overseeing state finances, and transferring powers from the legislature to the president. The Public Forces became instruments of support for the federal government. The Army won the struggle for hegemony among the security forces. The growth of the police was practically stopped. With a monopoly on heavy weapons, the Army had unquestionable superiority. There was never a return to the pre-1930 situation.

Regional elites were not destroyed, but centralization was not fully reversed in the Fourth Republic (1945–1964). Governors were relevant, but no longer defied the federal government. The 1946 Constitution confirmed the role of the Military Police, as the Public Forces would become known, as auxiliary and reserve forces of the Army. Sometimes they were commanded by Army officers. Their focus gradually shifted from military activities to public safety and order maintenance. The ambitious Federal Department of Public Security, the forerunner of the Federal Police, tried, with limited success, to centralize the police, especially in the areas of investigation and political police.

=== After 1960 ===
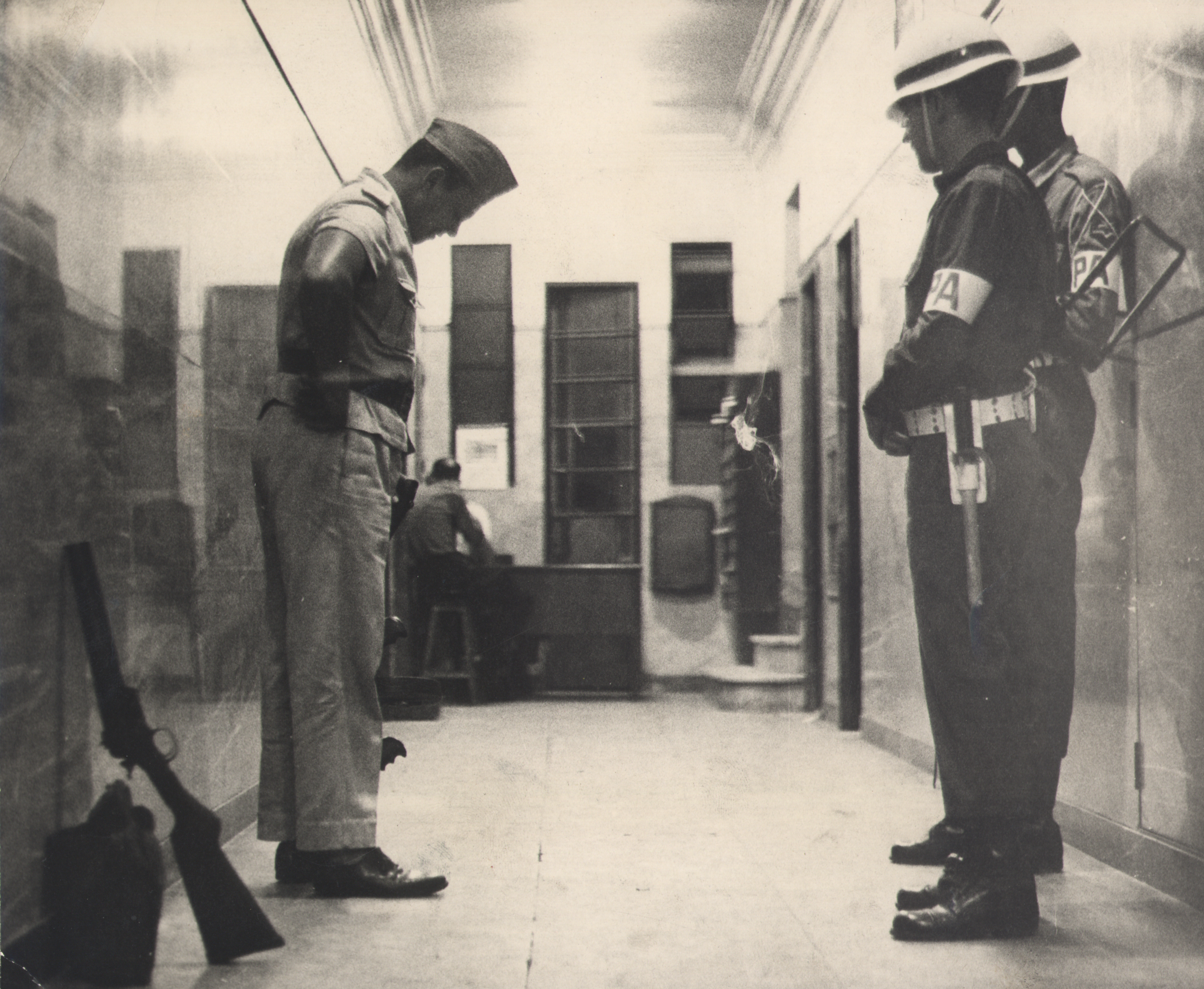
A Rio de Janeiro police soldier surrendering his gun to the Air Force Police in 1964

The Military Police still appeared in the political crises at the end of the Fourth Republic. In the Legality Campaign in 1961, the state forces of Rio Grande do Sul and Goiás prepared to face the Armed Forces, but they could no longer matched their firepower. The Military Brigade would only have light weapons to face tanks, artillery, and aerial bombardment. The officers' deep military spirit still manifested itself, and the Military Brigade was momentarily a state army again. In the military operations of the 1964 coup, the confrontation with the Armed Forces was intended, to a greater or lesser extent, by the police of Rio Grande do Sul (in Porto Alegre and after Operation Farroupilha), Guanabara (during the events of the coup in Rio de Janeiro), Pernambuco (against the deposition of Miguel Arraes) and especially Minas Gerais (Operation Popeye).

During the administration of governor Magalhães Pinto, the Minas Gerais police opposed the national trend, focusing on military preparation. Still, their machine guns and mortars were no match for the First Army's strength. For general Antônio Carlos Muricy, commander of mixed forces of the Army and Minas Gerais police in 1964, even with the efforts of the Minas Gerais government, the military police would not withstand prolonged combat. The military police still had considerable military potential, but they were also important for their ability to be used against civilians.

The Brazilian military dictatorship (1964–1985) completed the centralization of the military police, subordinating them to the Army, which created the General Inspectorate of the Military Police. In 1969, a decree-law determined "the control and coordination of the Military Police through the General Staff of the Army throughout the national territory, by the armies and military commands of areas in the respective jurisdictions". According to the precepts of the national security ideology, the Military Police should be an auxiliary force in the fight against the armed struggle against the dictatorship. The Civil Guards were merged with the Public Forces. The Military Police gained a more police character, receiving the monopoly of proactive policing. Until then, they were "markedly quartere" and focused on guarding sensible points. Proactive policing was not a novelty in its history, however; it already had a long tradition since before the Republic.
