= Anarchism in Brazil =

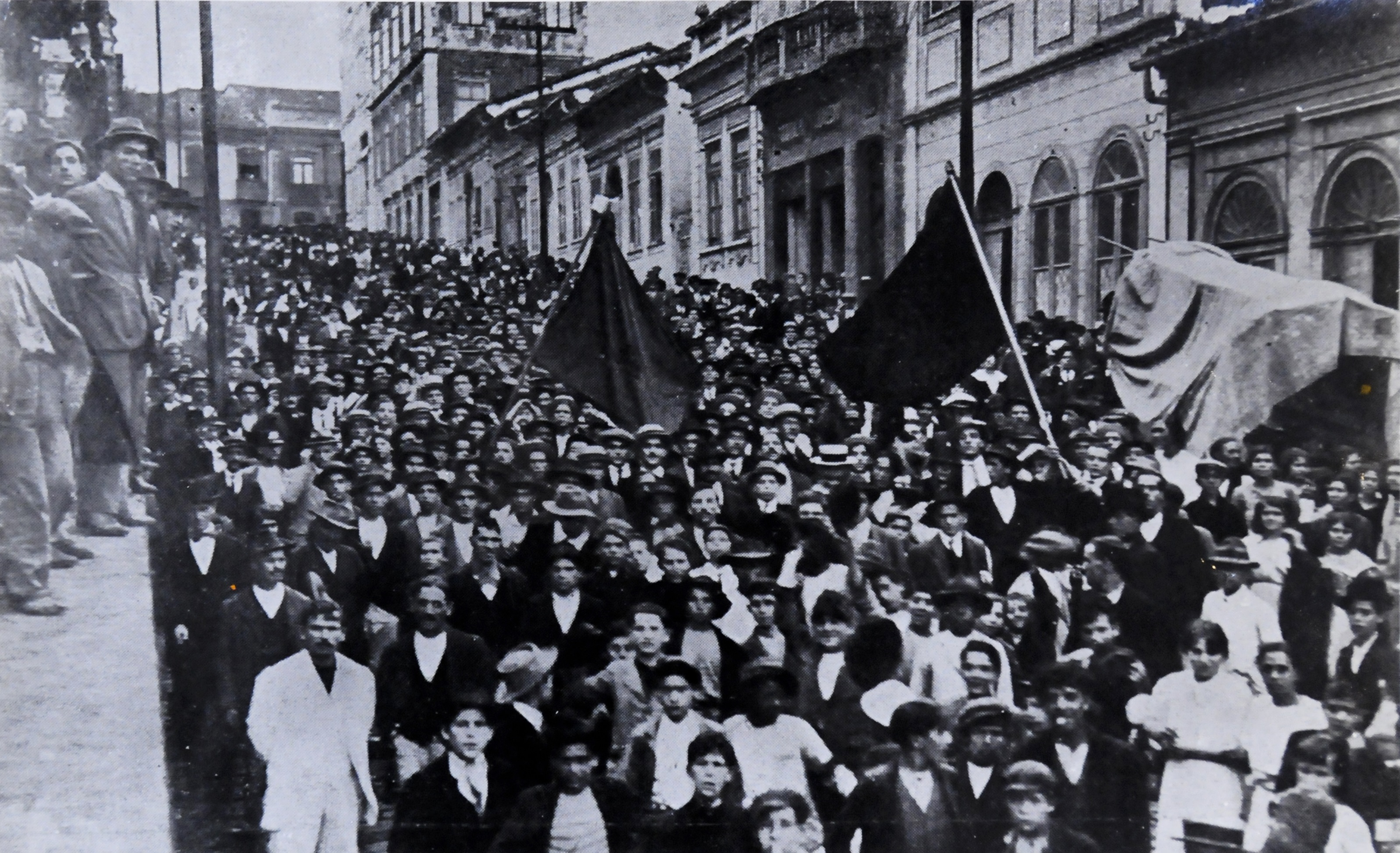
Workers raise flags during the São Paulo General Strike of 1917

Anarchism (Portuguese: Anarquismo) was an influential contributor to the social politics of the First Brazilian Republic. During the epoch of mass migrations of European labourers at the end of the nineteenth and the beginning of the twentieth century, anarchist ideas started to spread, particularly amongst the country’s labour movement. Along with the labour migrants, many Italian, Spanish, Portuguese and German political exiles arrived, many holding anarchist or anarcho-syndicalist ideas. Some did not come as exiles but rather as a type of political entrepreneur, including Giovanni Rossi's anarchist commune, the Cecília Colony, which lasted few years but at one point consisted of 200 individuals.

The working conditions and the oligarchic political system of the First Republic, which made it difficult for workers to participate, meant that anarchism quickly gained strength among workers. Revolutionary syndicalism exerted a great influence on the workers' movement, especially at workers' congresses and in the strikes of the period. Anarchists also contributed to the creation of a series of periodicals for the workers' press and founded several Modern Schools around the country. Anarchism ceased to be hegemonic in Brazil's workers' movement from the 1920s, when the Communist Party of Brazil (PCB) was created and, mainly, due to the repression promoted by the government of Artur Bernardes. Revolutionary syndicalism went into crisis during Getúlio Vargas' government, when the unions started to come under the control of the State, resulting in the decline of anarchism, now without spaces for social insertion.

Between 1946 and 1964, anarchists concentrated their efforts on building an anarchist political organization and on cultural actions, while maintaining initiatives in the trade unions. With the 1964 coup d'état, anarchist activity became even more limited due to repression. Despite this, there was a certain anarchist performance in the student movement of the period. In 1977, during the process of redemocratization, libertarians resumed their periodic press, starting a process of rearticulating anarchism in Brazil.

Beginning in the 1990s, the process of reorganizing anarchism in Brazil culminated in the creation of organizations influenced by the especifismo of the Federación Anarquista Uruguaya (FAU), in a process that resulted in the foundation of the Coordenação Anarquista Brasileira (CAB) in 2012. Anarchists have since maintained a relevant, albeit minority, participation in various types of collective actions, such as union organizations, community and neighborhood associations, student mobilizations, homeless and landless movements and in waves of protests, like those of 2013 and the demonstrations against the 2014 World Cup.

== Origins ==
Historiography normally attributes the roots of Brazilian anarchism to European immigration. After the abolition of slavery in Brazil during second half of the 19th century, political elites were convinced that the arrival of European workers would bring advantages to the country's economy. Brazilian intellectuals agreed that this would have a beneficial effect on the "whitening" of the Brazilian population. Very stimulated by Brazilian government propaganda, waves of Europeans came to Brazil between 1870 and the beginning of World War I, mostly Italians, Portuguese and Spaniards.

Most of the initial immigrants were of rural origin and without previous political or union experience. They often intended to work in agriculture, especially São Paulo coffee farms during the coffee cycle. Industrial establishments, however, tripled in Brazil during the 1880s, and many immigrants went to the nascent industrial centers after disastrous experiences in coffee plantations. The industrial centers also received new waves of European immigrants, now coming from urban areas, having previous experiences with union organization.

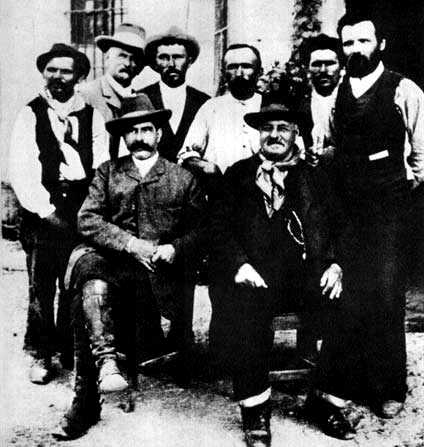
Giovanni Rossi (right) and other Italian anarchists who embarked in Brazil to form the Cecília Colony

In this context, anarchism started to spread among Brazilian workers in the 1890s through propaganda groups and periodicals. Among the pioneers were: Gli Schiavi Bianchi (1892), L'Asno Umano (1894) and L'Avvenire (1894–1895), published in São Paulo by groups composed mostly of Italian immigrants; O Despertar (1898) and O Protesto (1898–1900), published in Rio de Janeiro by groups that brought together Brazilians, Spaniards and Portuguese. In the last decade of the 19th century, anarchist action was guided by mainly informal propaganda groups, who published periodicals, educated workers, and participated in various working class associations.

As early as 1892, anarchists organized the first May Day activities in Brazil and were soon the target of repression. In Rio de Janeiro, the police reported meetings of foreigners who sought to spread libertarian ideas among workers. The newspaper Correio Paulistano, official body of the Republican Party of São Paulo (PRP), denounced in 1893 the entry of anarchist immigrants into the country, classifying them as dangerous individuals, heads of "a terrible destructive sect", which aimed to "implant disorder and a fratricidal struggle, incompatible with the abundance and excellence of our living resources." During the activities of the 1898 May Day, several anarchists were arrested in São Paulo.

Anarchist experiments took place in Brazil during the 1890s, such as the Cecília Colony, undertaken by the Italian Giovanni Rossi. The experimental rural community, formed in 1890 in Palmeira, Paraná, sought to put libertarian (anarchist) principles into practice, such as collectivized work, a communal income fund, and sanctioned free love. The experiment ended in 1894, buffeted by sectors of the local elite and internal problems, such as material poverty and some settlers' difficulty adapting to the libertarian lifestyle. The Cecília Colony did not leave deep marks in the history of the Brazilian anarchist movement, but later some of its ex-colonists joined the military in São Paulo, Paraná, and Rio Grande do Sul.

== First Republic (1889–1930) ==
Organized workers initially believed the Proclamation of the Republic would inaugurate a new era of political and social rights, but the republican regime ultimately disappointed them. Most workers were subjected to long working hours—up to 16 hours a day—with little time for rest and leisure. These workers lived in precarious housing or, in the case of company towns, in residences subject to employer control. They suffered from transportation and infrastructure problems. In the case of illness, disability, or unemployment, workers without a charitable fund from the company or a subscription to an aid society were completely unassisted due to the absence of social policies.

The First Republic's electoral system, with open voting and control of elections by the ruling parties, hindered workers' ability to participate in political life. This exclusionary, oligarchic political model and lack of institutional channels for social demands strengthened Brazilian anarchism during the First Republic. Workers included a considerable proportion of ex-slaves and proletarianized immigrants with very low civil, political, and social rights—circumstances that encouraged worker direct action. Revolutionary syndicalism, (Note: Some authors use the term "anarcho-syndicalism" to define the trade union approach defended by anarchist militants in the First Republic. This term, however, refers to the positions adopted by the Argentine Federación Obrera Regional Argentina (FORA) and by the Spanish Confederación Nacional del Trabajo (CNT), who defended a programmatic link between anarchism and the union. In Brazil, before the 1920s, this approach had been adopted only by the Local Workers Federation of Santos. Most Brazilian anarchists followed revolutionary syndicalism and adopted the French Confédération Générale du Travail (CGT) model, upholding the political neutrality and autonomy of the unions, in order to aggregate as many workers as possible.) spread by anarchist militants, greatly influenced the labor movement.

Worker organization was a hallmark of Brazil during the First Republic, to which anarchists contributed. The volume of associations were particularly visible at times when the labor movement was on the rise, when favorable economic conditions conferred greater bargaining power on the workers and strike movements were more likely to succeed. Despite economic recessions and repression, which could lead to the closure of associations, the workers were prone to reconstitute and expand their organizations in more favorable circumstances. Union organizations often formed part of local or state federations. In revolutionary syndicalist tendencies, a federalist structure prevailed with non-hierarchical structures and no paid employees.

In the First Republic, the male labor force was instrumental in manufacturing and industrial work and female labor was significant in the textile and clothing sectors, reaching a majority in some places. The weight of women's work was always underrepresented in workers' organizations. In this sense, Brazilian anarchists took some initiatives to create "female nuclei", such as the Group for Female Emancipation in Rio de Janeiro. The seamstress unions, which emerged in 1919 in Rio de Janeiro and São Paulo, were among the few exceptions of unions organized and run exclusively by women, and were driven by anarchists such as Elvira Boni, Elisa Gonçalves de Oliveira, Aída Morais, Isabel Peleteiro, and Noêmia Lopes. Strikes organized with the strong female presence usually involved, in addition to demands for better wages and reduced working hours, complaints of sexual abuse and mistreatment by masters and foremen.

=== Strikes and associations for working hours ===
From the 19th century, there were several mutualist associations in Brazil that provided assistance to members in the event of illness, disability, unemployment, or death. During the early years of the labor movement, anarchist militants turned these associations into unionist bases with broader labor objectives such as the eight-hour day and a labor press. From 1900, multiple anarchist publications appeared in Brazil: O Libertário and A Terra Livre in Rio de Janeiro; O Amigo do Povo, A Lanterna and La Battaglia in São Paulo; A Luta in Porto Alegre; O Despertar in Curitiba; and O Regenerador in Ceará.

Conditions in the early 1900s were favorable for the emergence of workers' movements, including the 1903 economic boom and the proliferation of workers' organizations that grew from late 1890s militant action. A 1903 textile industry strike in the Federal District assembled workers across industries laid the groundwork for further direct action among Rio de Janeiro unions. A series of worker federations were founded in the subsequent years.

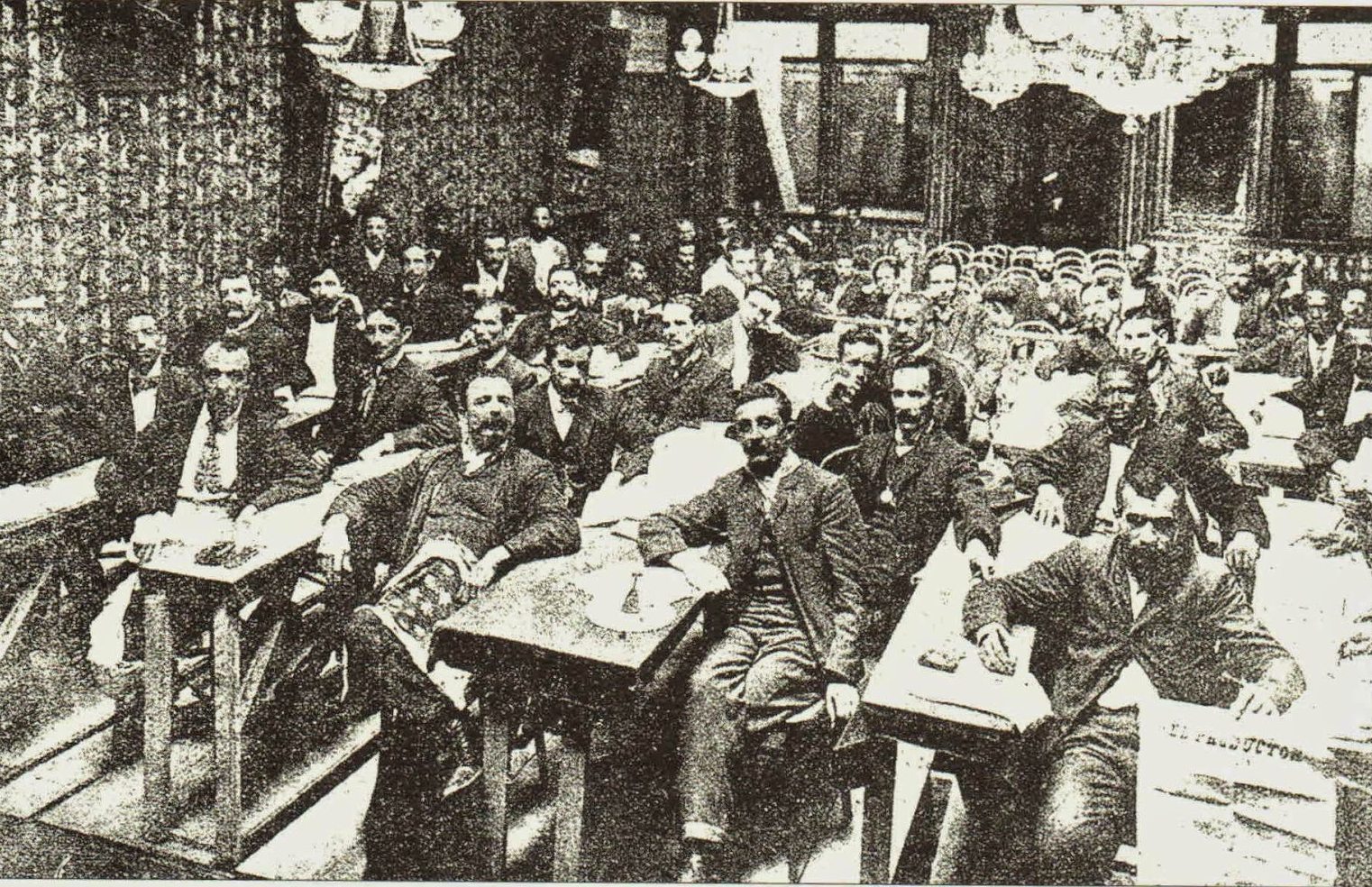
Delegates of the First Brazilian Workers' Congress, held in April 1906, gathered at Centro Galego in Rio de Janeiro.

With the rise of the labor movement, the First Brazilian Workers' Congress was held in April 1906 in Rio de Janeiro's Centro Galego. At first, only socialists could participate, with "revolutionary elements ... prohibited". The anarchists, however, were present among the 43 delegates, including Edgard Leuenroth, Joaquim Mota Assunção, Luiz Magrassi, and Alfredo Vasques. They represented 28 associations—mainly industrial branches but also other industry: railroads, warehouses, coffee shops, stevedores, and the service sector. Anarchist proposals codified their revolutionary syndicalism into the labor movement, as unions participating in the congress signed common resolutions on union neutrality, federalism, decentralization, direct action, and the general strike. This revolutionary syndicalism program let various political and religious positions coexist, unified in the economic struggle common to the workers they represented. The Congress also created the Brazilian Workers' Confederation (Portuguese: Confederação Operária Brasileira, COB), founded in 1908, and its official press organ, A Voz do Trabalhador.

For the 1906 May Day, workers attended public rallies for the eight-hour work day and speakers paid tribute to the thousands of Russian revolutionaries victimized by the tsarist government. Anarchist speakers included Oreste Ristori in Santos, Everardo Dias in Campinas, and Leuenroth in Jundiaí. Workers continued to strike and win working hours reductions across Brazil. Strikes led to federal decrees for unions to legally represent the working class, acquire property, and establish assistance funds for their members. The 1907 Adolfo Gordo Law authorized state expulsion of foreigners who posed a risk to "national security or public tranquility", including anarchist militants, and was widely used in its first year.

=== The Brazilian Workers' Confederation and the 1913 Workers' Congress ===
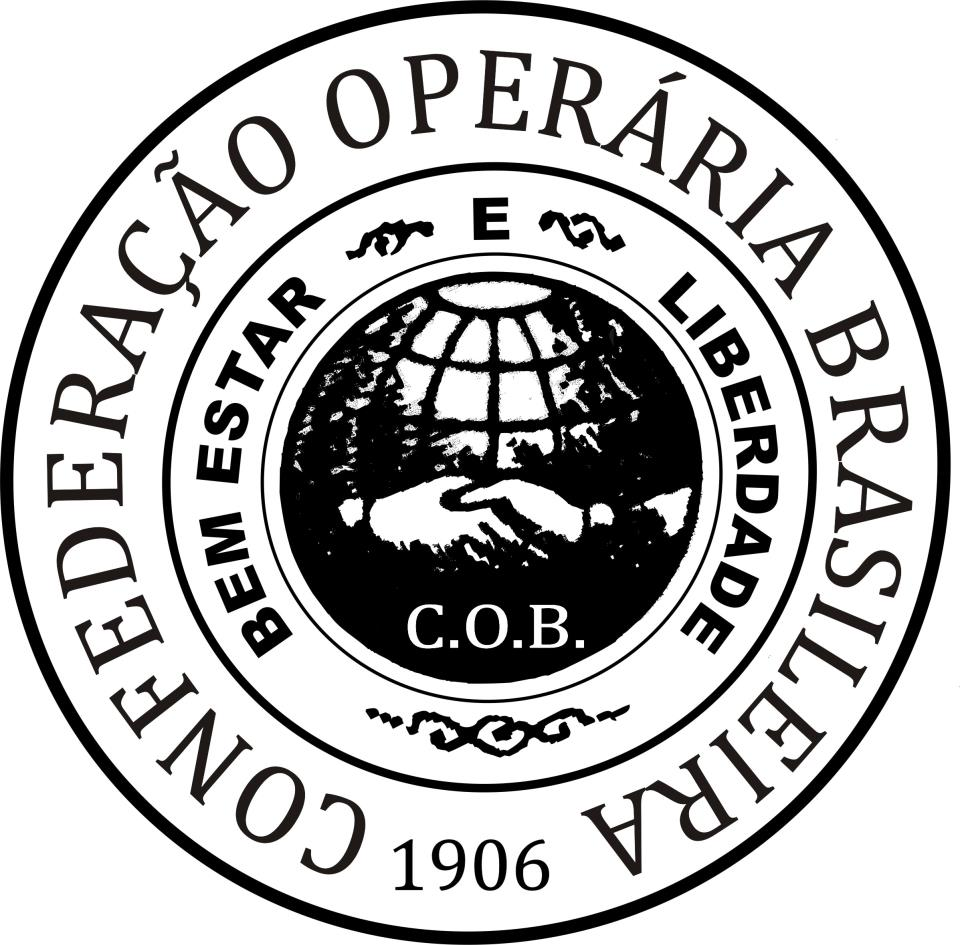
Seal of Brazilian Workers' Confederation

In March 1908, in Rio de Janeiro, two years after the First Brazilian Workers' Congress was held, the Brazilian Workers' Confederation (COB) was founded, which proposed to represent around 50 workers' associations. In accordance with its constitution, the COB began to publish the periodical A Voz do Trabalhador in Rio de Janeiro, whose first issue appeared at the beginning of the year. From the beginning, the COB campaigned against the Sortition Law, approved in January of that year, which instituted compulsory military service. From 1908 onwards, there was a decline in strike activity, in the context of increasing repression and the deterioration of the economy with the end of the growth cycle. As a result, the first phase of the COB only lasted until December 1909, when the twenty-first issue of A Voz do Trabalhador came out, which then closed its doors. However, the COB promoted, during this period, a series of rallies against a possible war between Brazil and Argentina and against the execution of anarchist educator Francisco Ferrer by the Spanish government. The last major strike of the period took place in January 1909, involving the Great Western railroad workers in Pernambuco, Paraíba, Rio Grande do Norte and Alagoas, demanding wage improvements. The movement ended after twelve days, with the promise of the governor of Pernambuco, Herculano Bandeira, to intervene with the company in favor of the strikers' demands.

The election of marshal Hermes da Fonseca as president of Brazil in 1910 brought some novelties to the traditional political framework and to the relations between the State and the labor movement. Fonseca was the first presidential candidate to mention the existence of a workers' problem to be solved on his platform. During his government, he sought dialogue with the reformist trade unionists, incorporating the reformist leader Sarandy Raposo, founder of the Brazilian Cooperative Trade Union Confederation (CSCB), at the Ministry of Agriculture's Unions and Cooperatives Propaganda Office, in addition to initiating a program for the construction of proletarian villages, interrupted in 1914. However, Hermes da Fonseca also supported a hardening of the Adolfo Gordo Law.

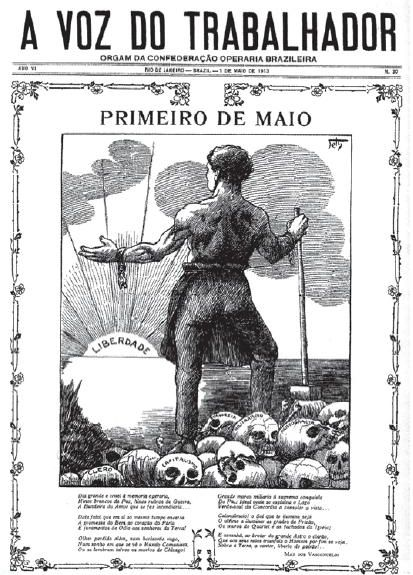
Edition of A Voz do Trabalhador of May 1, 1913

In August 1912, some unions started a new wave of strikes that lasted until the economic recession of 1914. In their first months, the workers obtained a series of victories, as was the case of a salary increase granted to shoemakers in Rio de Janeiro. On several occasions, the strikers agreed to return to work under the employers' promise to partially comply with their demands. The most important of these strikes occurred in Minas Gerais, in Juiz de Fora, where, in August, several circumstances paralyzed their activities and the movement assumed the dimension of a general strike. In addition to the strikes to reduce working hours, between 1912 and 1913 there were several demonstrations against expulsions of foreigners and campaigns against the loss of life. The new rise of the workers' movement brought reactions from the authorities, with intensified repression and an attempt to expand and tighten the terms of the Adolfo Gordo Law. On the other hand, Hermes da Fonseca's collaboration with the reformists made it possible, in November 1912, for the so-called Fourth Brazilian Workers' Congress, (Note: The organizers of the congress, in an attempt to disregard the 1906 Workers' Congress as the first, took into account two socialist congresses held in 1901.) at the seat of the Federal Senate and with the support of federal deputy Mário Hermes.

Such a congress, excluding revolutionary tendencies, was aimed at the creation of a Workers' Party and a new central, the Brazilian Labor Confederation (CBT). The resolutions of this congress, however, did not go much beyond the publication of a booklet, having little or no practical results in terms of national articulation, of building a new central or workers' party. On the contrary, the disclosure of their preparations motivated anarchists to foster a re-articulation with the union movement and the definition of new directions to combat cooperatives. The FORJ, practically inactive since 1910, was invigorated by a meeting of several union leaders in May 1912 and, in early October, brought together worker leaders from Rio de Janeiro with the purpose of reactivating the COB, preparing a Reorganizing Commission. The Commission declared, in January 1913, the reconstitution of the COB, whose direction included Rosendo dos Santos as general secretary, and João Leuenroth as treasurer. The newspaper A Voz do Trabalhador was also reactivated. It was up to COB to organize the campaign against the expulsion law, which, in addition to promoting rallies in several Brazilian cities, triggered a campaign in Portugal, Spain and Italy, to discourage emigration to Brazil. At the end of 1912, the COB Reorganizing Commission sent a circular to workers associations asking them to nominate delegates for the 2nd Brazilian Workers' Congress, to be held in Rio de Janeiro.

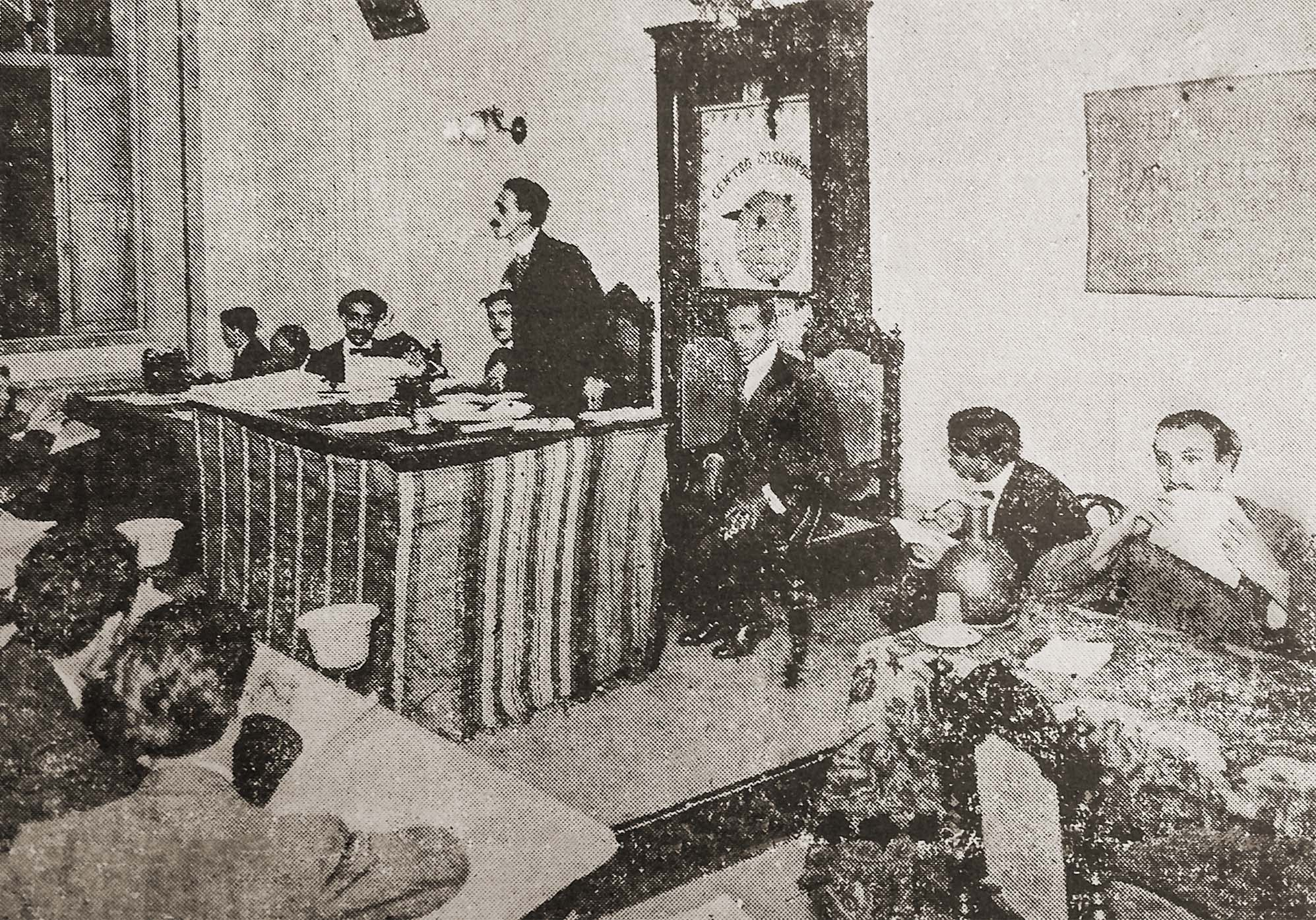
Closing session of the 2nd Brazilian Workers' Congress, held at the Cosmopolitan Center in 1913

The 2nd Brazilian Workers' Congress was held in Rio de Janeiro, during the second week of September, at the headquarters of Centro Cosmopolita, by a union of employees in hotels, cafes, restaurants and the like. 117 delegates represented two state federations, five municipal federations, 52 unions, societies, leagues and four journals. Congress decided that cooperative associations that did not agree with direct action methods should not be admitted to the COB federative system. Within this system, unions would organize themselves by industry or profession. For its constitution, the union could have a number of no less than 25 members. Where there was not a sufficient number of members by industry or profession, it was recommended to form various trade unions, covering manual and intellectual workers.

The Santos Local Workers Federation (FOLS) that was leading the adoption of anarchist propaganda within the unions associated with the COB took up a good part of the congress, being contested by several militants. Joaquim Santos Barboza, from FORJ, pointed out that anarchism should be accepted and never imposed, otherwise it would not be anarchism. Most of those present then decided to endorse the principles of 1906, based on direct action against capitalism, freedom of association, federalism and the religious and political neutrality of the unions. A complementary motion by the anarchist José Borobio tried to contemplate the complaints of his fellow Santos, trying to make it clear that, within the unions, a "wide exposition and discussion of all political and philosophical ideas" among its affiliates was possible and desirable. This controversy had been preceded by a debate held in the pages of A Voz do Trabalhador between Neno Vasco and João Crispim shortly before the realization of the congress. While the first advocated union neutrality as a means of bringing together the greatest possible number of workers, the second argued that, for the union to assume a truly combative character, it should declare itself openly anarchist.

The period that preceded the Congress and the one that immediately followed it, coupled with the process of mobilization of various categories of workers with the increase in economic activity, gave a strong stimulus to the expansion of resistance associations, including where they were not yet taking place. Still in 1908, Bahian anarchists founded the Bahia Workers' Federation and the Alagoas Workers' Union joined the COB. In early November 1913, strikes by weaving workers broke out in Alagoas, Cachoeira and Rio Largo, which lasted until the middle of the following month. In June 1914, in Pará, there were strikes by carters and construction workers, resulting in the deportation without trial of several Portuguese syndicalist, including the Galician anarchist Antônio Dominguez. In the same year, in Manaus, there were successive port strikes, and the anarchists organized the Amazonas Workers' Federation, affiliated to the COB since its founding. The COB also sent delegates to states where the workers' organization was at a critically low level. José Elias da Silva was sent to Pernambuco, where he managed to transform most of the cooperative associations into unions fighting for a salary increase and the eight-hour workday, in addition to founding the Pernambuco Workers Resistance Federation, in 1914. However, the resumption of industrial activity was short-lived, and the cycle of economic crisis was resumed with the decrease in production and the consequent increase in unemployment, worsening with the outbreak of World War I in August 1914.

With the outbreak of war, anarchists became involved in the anti-militarist struggle. In March 1915, FORJ created a Popular Commission for Agitation Against War. In São Paulo, labor leaders and directors of proletarian newspapers organized an International Commission Against the War. The anarchists of the Feminine Center for Young Idealists, led by Emma Mennocchi, launched a Committee of Agitation Against Compulsory Military Service, composed of Maria Antonia Soares, Sofia Loise, Encarnación Mejias and Esperança Maestre, and published a manifesto to the mothers of Brazil, in which "after exposing the evils that will result from this law, I appeal for maternal feelings to come with you to prevent such a law from taking effect". In October 1915, the COB called for an International Peace Congress, in Rio de Janeiro, in which two delegates from Argentine libertarian associations participated, in addition to representatives from five Brazilian states and the Federal District. This event resulted in the creation of the Committee of International Relations, with the aim of organizing a South American confederation of union entities for future membership of the International Workers' Association. In the same month and year, and with similar points of discussion, anarchists, taking advantage of the presence of militants in the Federal District, started the South American Anarchist Congress, which sought to define common strategies for libertarians on the continent, whose deliberations did not distance themselves much of those held at workers' congresses.

=== Strike wave of 1917–1919 and the Workers' Congress of 1920 ===
The prolongation of the war in Europe helped to bring about, in 1916, a recovery of industrial production. As imported products stopped reaching Brazilian ports, national industries returned to employing workers to meet growing demand. However, there was a considerable increase in the cost of living, given that several products were exported to countries in conflict. In 1915, the prices of rice, sugar and corn increased significantly; the following year, the wholesale prices of various products went up, such as beans and manioc flour; and wheat became scarce and expensive. Wages, however, remained at the same levels as in the years before the war. Food prices continued to rise during the first six months of 1917. Basic items tended to be 20% to 150% more expensive than the previous year. The favorable environment for the satisfaction of demands due to the resumption of industrial activity led the labor movement to an accelerated process of reorganization in disarticulated resistance societies during the crisis, resulting in a strike wave starting in 1917.

In January 1917, the FORJ promoted a Central Committee of Agitation and Propaganda Against the Excess and the Tax Increase. The increase in the cost of living was the theme of the speeches of the May 1 of that year. In Rio de Janeiro, a speaker took the floor to deliver an impassioned speech, saying that hunger was knocking on the doors of the working class and that it was necessary that "the people act with energy, going to the warehouses where the goods that are missing in the workman's home are stacked and accumulated." In the same month, several strikes broke out in the textile industry after a threat of mass layoffs at the Corcovado fabric factory. The Chief of Police, Aurelino de Araújo Leal, informed that the speakers, at rallies, had advised depredations and attacks on the police itself, launched a circular banning workers' rallies. On May 11, more than 2,500 people, disrespecting the order of the police chief, moved towards the Corcovado fabric factory, where violent clashes with the police took place. The FORJ appointed João Gonçalves da Silva to head a delegation of three people to have an audience with the then President of the Republic, Venceslau Brás. Upon arriving at Palácio do Catete, they were informed that the President, although he was always ready to receive "from the most humble to the most powerful", could not receive a delegation that was part of "an agitator dominated by anarchist influences". After the presidential refusal, João Gonçalves and FORJ, who remained in permanent session during the events, declared that the workers did not consider themselves humble.

The main labor unrest of 1917 occurred in the city of São Paulo. On June 10, the weavers of the Cotonificio Rodolfo Crespi, owned by Commander Rodolfo Crespi, located in the industrial district of Mooca, in the capital of São Paulo, asked for a salary increase. The demand was rejected and the cotton workers went on strike. Cotton workers were joined by other workers from the Mooca neighborhoods, Brás and Cambuci. In July, a gap opened up in the impasse, when the workers of the fabric factory of the firm Nami Jafet, in the Cambuci neighborhood, agreed to return to their jobs, after receiving a salary raise for the night shift. However, on the 9th, the severe repression of a demonstration by the São Paulo Public Force resulted in the death of the anarchist shoemaker Francisco José Martinez, the arrest of several militants and the closure of the Liga Operária da Mooca, and served as a catalyst for the generalization of the movement. On the same day, the Proletarian Defense Committee was created, with the objective of guiding the strike, formed by the militants Gigi Damiani, of the libertarian periodical Guerra Sociale, Teodoro Monicelli, of the socialist paper Avanti!, and Edgard Leuenroth, secretary of the Committee and who had started on June 8 the publication of the weekly A Plebe, which would become one of the most important Brazilian anarchist periodicals.

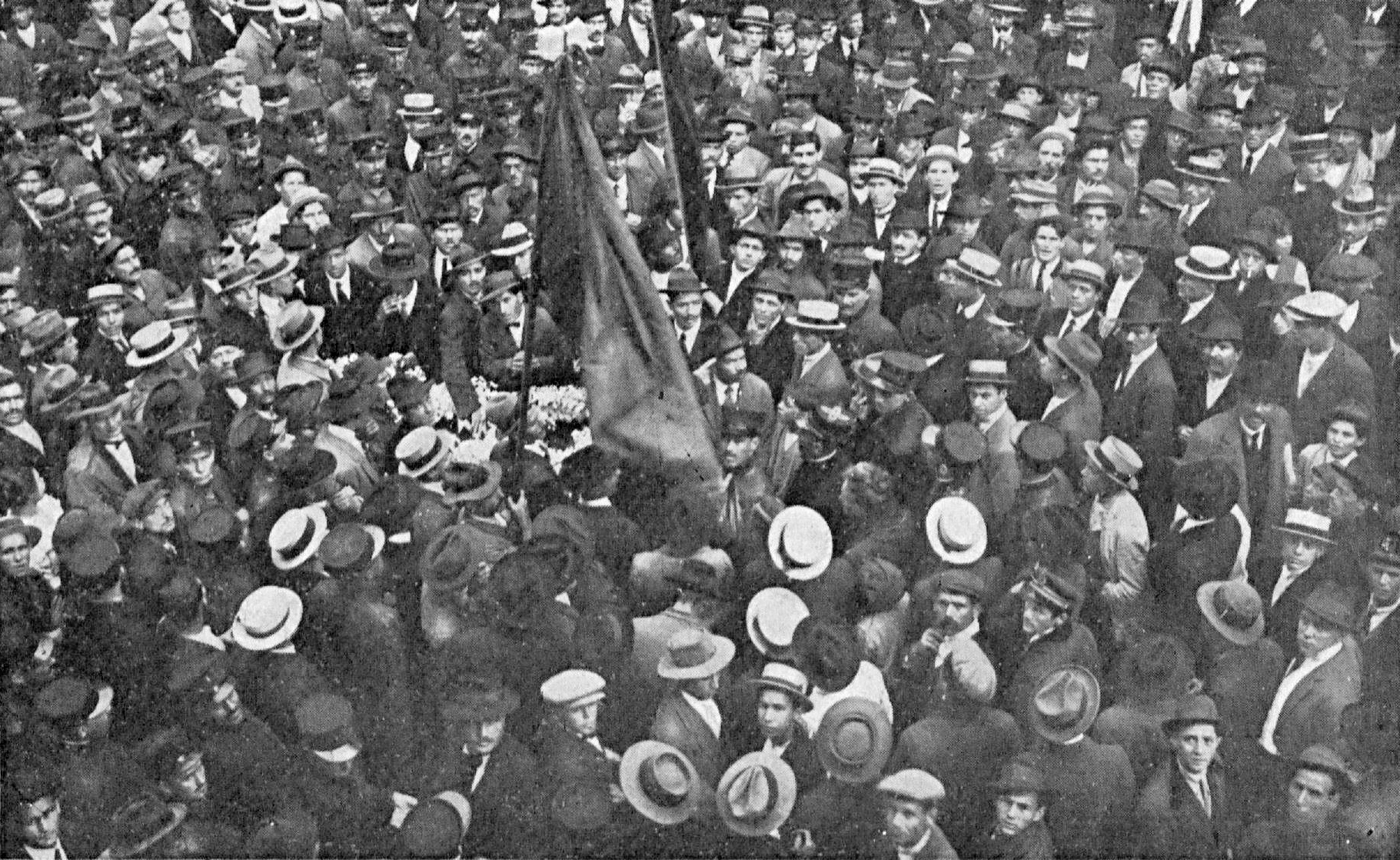
Funeral of the anarchist shoemaker Francisco José Martinez, at the Araçá cemetery. His death was the catalyst for the 1917 general strike

With the confirmation of Martínez's death on July 10, approximately 10,000 people attended his funeral the following day, heading for the city center. Once there, the police blocked access to the government palace square and the central police headquarters. The crowd, forced to pass through other avenues, stopped at Rua 15 de Novembro to call for the freedom of the imprisoned workers. Back at the cemetery, part of the crowd went to Praça da Sé, staying there to listen to a series of speeches on the situation of the working class. It was soon decided to send a delegation to meet Tirso Martins, Chief of Police of São Paulo, to demand the reopening of the Liga Operária da Mooca and the release of the imprisoned workers; another part of the crowd, less peaceful, walked the streets of the neighborhoods of Brás, Mooca and Cambuci and, through persuasion or violence, managed to join more workers, closing the establishments that were still active, including the Nami Jafet factory, which had given in days before to the demands of its workers.

It is estimated that by July 12 the number of strikers in the city of São Paulo had increased from 15 to 20 thousand workers, with the addition of chauffeurs and staff from Companhia Light & Power, Cia. Do Gás and most small factories and workshops in the city. The assaults on Light & Power trams led it to suspend the traffic of its vehicles, at the same time that the great number of depredations forced the closing of the trade. On July 13, Tirso Martins distributed two newsletters, the first prohibiting meetings in the squares and on the streets; the second advising the people not to leave their homes at night, making it known that "the police are acting with all their energy against the rioters and the anarchists who have been attacking public order for days". The Secretary of Justice Elói Chaves, presiding on the 12th of a meeting of industrialists from São Paulo, heard Rodolfo Crespi agree to grant his workers a wage increase, followed by other industrialists the very next day.

At the time, the Proletarian Defense Committee had already prepared a list of 11 common claims. A working-class crowd, gathered at the former hippodrome in Mooca, decided that the strike movement would only end when such demands were met. Among them, they included: salary increase; eight-hour day, with increased pay for all overtime work; guarantee of "permanent work"; abolition of night work for women and children under 18; and abolition of work in factories for those under 14 years old. On the 14th, through a committee of journalists gathered at the headquarters of O Estado de S. Paulo, the Proletarian Defense Committee negotiated with the employers and the state government the agenda of demands. The industrialists maintained their agreement to grant increased wages; they were willing to respect the workers' right to form associations, not to dismiss any employee for taking part in the strike, and to "improve the moral, material and economic conditions of the São Paulo workforce". The delegates of the Proletarian Defense Committee decided to accept the concessions of the industrialists, provided that the government "backed" them with certain measures considered indispensable, such as the release of the workers arrested during the strike and the recognition of the right of assembly.

The general strike in São Paulo had repercussions on the labor movement in the interior of the state and in the rest of the country. In the Federal District, the July 1917 strike movement, triggered after the end of the São Paulo strike, brought together carpenters, shoemakers, metalworkers, bakers, construction workers, textiles, tailors and hatters. Due to resistance from reformist union members who collaborated with the government, it was not possible to trigger a general strike, nor to form a commission to manage any type of strike, even though several categories were paralyzed. These striker categories then demobilized as they achieved some results.

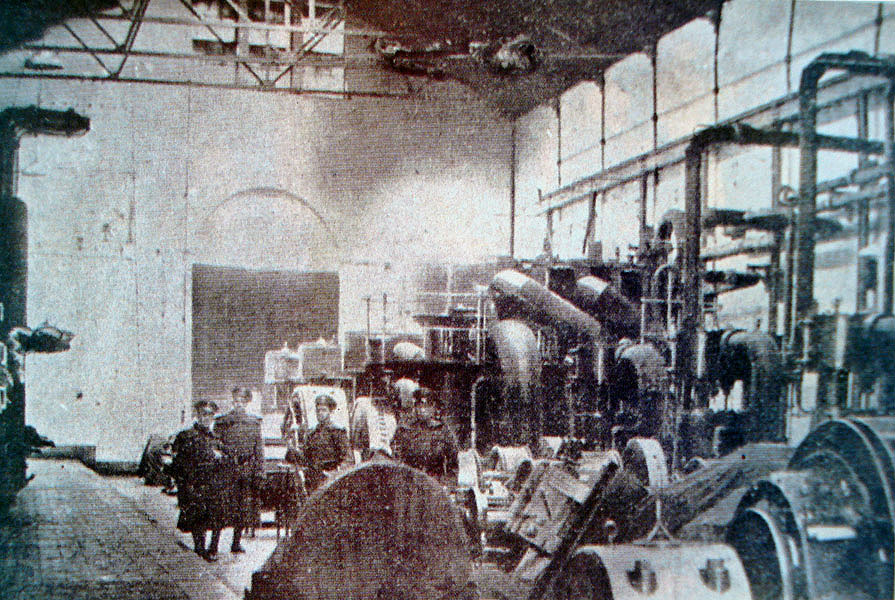
Factory guarded by government militia during the 1917 strike in Porto Alegre

In Rio Grande do Sul, significant movements were triggered in Porto Alegre and Pelotas. In the capital of Rio Grande do Sul, the general strike broke out between the end of July and the beginning of August. Following the example of what happened in the capital of São Paulo, a Popular Defense League was formed, composed of anarchists experienced in the union struggle, such as Cecílio Villar and Zenon de Almeida, and by some emerging leaders, such as Abílio de Nequete. The League launched a manifesto to the people and workers, with a list of specific demands, such as the increase in workers' wages, and general demands for the entire population, such as the decrease in the price of food, tram passes and the installation of free markets in working-class neighborhoods. Porto Alegre workers promoted a massive mobilization that paralyzed the city from July 31 to August 4, 1917, when Borges de Medeiros received a League commission at the Government Palace, committing himself to take measures to control the food prices and increase the pay of workers at the service of the state, in what they expected to be followed by businessmen. In Pelotas, the strike occurred between the 9th and 17 August, and a Popular Defense Commission was formed. The occurrence of conflicts during the strike caused the state government to send the Chief of Police to mediate the conflict, and the stoppage ended with a positive balance for the workers.

Another important stoppage occurred in Recife, on August 14, when a series of demands were presented at a rally convened by the Union of Various Crafts (SOV). Among the demands were the establishment of the 8-hour day, the equalization of wages between men and women, hygiene measures in the workplace, the decrease in rents, food prices and land transport fees and fluvial. The strike spread, including the action of the strike commission created from the SOV meetings, which were coordinated by militants linked to revolutionary syndicalism. The state government, in the person of the President Manoel Borba, severely criticized the movement, causing an increase in police persecution. At this juncture and with the arrest of several leaders, the Chief of Police started negotiations with the Confederação Operária de Pernambuco (COP), a supporter of a reformist unionism and allied with the government. As a mediator of the conflict, the Academic Congress, representing the students of the Faculty of Law of Recife, entered the scene. The result of these negotiations was the end of the strike, with no gains for the workers, on September 15.

In the same period, strikes also occurred in Paraná, Bahia and Pará. In Paraná, the anarchists of Curitiba used explosives during the strikes, even preventing the supply of the city, knocking down telephone poles and controlling access to the urban center. Although the movement was partially successful, many workers involved in the strike were arrested or deported. The second half of 1917 was marked by a repressive wave, especially in São Paulo and Rio de Janeiro, where several workers' associations were closed. Brazil's entry into the war in October further restricted the scope for action by the workers' movement. With the FORJ ban, closed by the police in August 1917, the General Union of Workers of Rio de Janeiro (UGT) was created. This Union, a clear attempt to regroup the resistance unions, saw the immediate adhesion of 13 class entities. Even in August, despite the repression, a strike at Companhia Cantareira e Viação Fluminense, which operated on the crossing of Baía da Guanabara between Rio de Janeiro and Niterói, took on the shape of an insurrection. The radicalization of the strike caused a confrontation between the strikers, supported by popular people, and the police. The fact ended up sensitizing sectors of the army in favor of the strikers, and the 58th Battalion of Hunters became involved in the struggle with the workers. On August 9, Cantareira rail workers proposed to end the strike, provided seafarers from the same company were granted a wage increase. The company declined the request, but the strikers still got back to work.

In 1918 there was a certain cooling of the strike movements, but localized strikes continued and, above all, the effort to expand and consolidate the workers' organizations started in the previous year. Repression and the impact of the Russian Revolution brought to militants new questions about the actions to be taken to advance the intensity that the mobilizations of the previous year reached. In this sense, the anarchists of Rio de Janeiro formed, that same year, the Anarchist Alliance, "an organ of unity, understanding, alliance of all anarchists of Rio de Janeiro, formed in groups or not". This organization was responsible for a series of articulations to promote an insurrection with the support of the army and categories of workers in the city of Rio de Janeiro. José Oiticica started promoting meetings at his home with the participation of important figures of the libertarian movement in Rio de Janeiro and militants from other states such as Manuel Campos, Agripino Nazaré, José Elias da Silva, João da Costa Pimenta, Álvaro Palmeira and Astrogildo Pereira. At these meetings, Oiticica stated that it was necessary to establish a popular government, as had been done in Russia.

The insurrectional plans were thwarted when Ricardo Correia Perpétuo, a member of the board in charge of distributing seditious newsletters among the soldiers stationed in Vila Militar, invited Army lieutenant Jorge Elias Ajus to participate in the movement, since he was in favor of the implantation of an "entirely popular" form of government in Brazil. However, Ajus was a spy, and he reported all the details of the conspiracy to the authorities. The goal was to bring a large contingent of workers to the Campo de São Cristovão and to wait for the arrival of the soldiers who would show solidarity with the workers; when this happened, the workers could take over the War Arsenal, dynamite the energy towers of the Federal Capital and proceed to the Catete Palace, where they would depose the President and proclaim a Soviet republic. On November 18, the strike was triggered and about 400 workers went to Campo de São Cristovão, but the movement did not have the support of the military, resulting in a violent confrontation between the army and the workers. The main leaders of the movement were arrested while meeting at the home of José Oiticica, the main leader of the uprising in the capital. Some remained imprisoned, such as Astrogildo Pereira, others were exiled to distant regions of the interior of Brazil, such as José Oiticica.

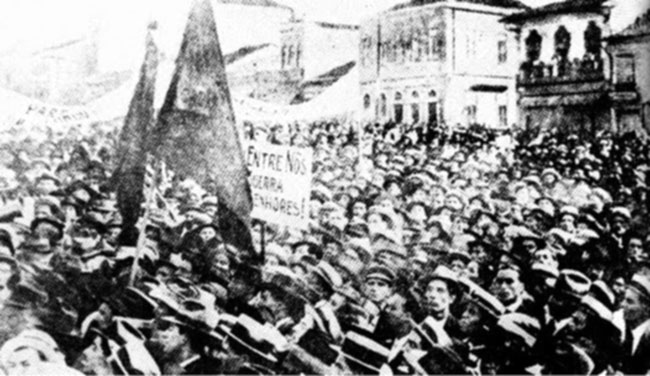
Workers gathered at Praça da Sé, in São Paulo, during a May 1 demonstration in 1919

In 1919, there was a resumption of the strike movement, this time, facing a patronage organized in class entities and better articulated with the repression. On May 1 of that year, there were demonstrations in Rio de Janeiro and São Paulo in favor of the Russian soviets and the revolutions underway in Hungary and Germany. In the Federal Capital, the demonstration had about 60 thousand people who, in addition to saluting the aforementioned revolutions, organized stoppages to pressure the bosses for the 8-hour day. In São Paulo, shortly after the celebrations, a general strike broke out, which started at the Matarazzo factory, where a worker accused the master general of harassing him for having spoken on the 1st of May. After a rough bout, the worker was fired. Many of his colleagues quit their jobs and took to the streets urging employees at other factories to follow their example. At the end of the day, around 10,000 workers were on strike, and demands were made. Once again the eight-hour day became one of the main demands, accompanied by others such as weekly rest, equal pay for men and women, recognition of the workers' right to organize and express themselves and lower prices for staple goods.

As the days went by, most of the industry workers joined the movement, with an estimated 20,000 walled workers on May 4. In its May 10 issue, the newspaper A Plebe pointed out the strike was a spontaneous movement that should not be attributed to the speeches of May 1. Even with strong repression, the movement continued until favorable agreements were reached, with the achievement of the eight-hour day in most factories. Also in Rio de Janeiro there were several strikes in the first half of 1919, initiated by seafarers, demanding a salary increase and an eight-hour day. On May 18, the number of workers absent from their jobs was estimated at 10,000. But the majority remained on strike for a short time, because employers, in general, were ready to grant the eight-hour day without a reduction in wages, even though striking outbreaks extended until July.

Other generalized strike movements were triggered in Salvador, Recife and Porto Alegre. The strike in Salvador, declared in early June 1919 by fabric and construction workers, spread within a few days, paralyzing the city. After a five-day strike, the Bahian workers won an agreement that granted them the eight-hour day without a reduction in wages; the contract tables were recalculated based on an additional 20%. The moderate action of the police, one of the features of the general strike in Salvador, was also noted as a characteristic of the general strike in Recife. In Porto Alegre, the strike acquired a more violent character. Initiated by the workers of the Light & Power Company on September 4, the movement soon was joined by bakers, carters and workers from the telephone company. On the 6th, a bomb was thrown at the Company, which operated through an engineer and three navy stokers. The police banned a rally planned by the strikers for the next day, in Montevideo Square. However, the FORGS lawyer consulted the Federal Constitution and deemed the rally legal. When the number of those present rose to about 500, a conflict broke out between the strikers and the military brigade. The strikers sought refuge wherever doors were open. Some of those who were already safe closed a door, hurriedly, to a worker. The soldiers killed him with a gunshot. On the 8th, troops from the military brigade, under the orders of the governor, invaded the headquarters of FORGS, the Union of Light Workers and União Metalúrgica; its leaders were imprisoned and by the 11th the strike was over, with the restoration of services offered by the Light & Power Company.

In the same year, the anarchists, still under the impact of the Russian Revolution, founded the Libertarian Communist Party, believing in the need to form a political nucleus that could lead, more clearly, anarchist actions in different sectors of society. The First Communist Conference in Brazil was held in Rio de Janeiro, from June 21 to 23, at the Cosmopolitan Center. Hundreds of people followed the development of the work conducted by 22 delegates, representing groups from the Federal District and the states of Alagoas, Minas Gerais, Paraíba, Pernambuco, Rio Grande do Sul and São Paulo. Of these 22 delegates, three were women. The program of the Libertarian Communist Party, defined during the conference, called for the suppression of the state, all religious authority and all laws; general resolutions would be taken in public assemblies, and minorities would enjoy full freedom for the formation of new communities. The social precepts of the document determined the elimination of private property and the administration of factories, railways and other public services by the workers and their respective associations, without anyone assuming management functions. In August 1919, under the direction of José Oitica and Astrogildo Pereira, the Libertarian Communist Party started to publish the weekly newspaper Spártacus.

Still in 1919, the anarchists organized in the Libertarian Communist Party prepared an insurrection that would have the participation of militants from São Paulo, Rio de Janeiro, Minas Gerais, Paraná, Rio Grande do Sul and Pernambuco. However, the explosion of a bomb in the neighborhood of Brás on October 19, which led to the death of four militant workers, one of them being the Spanish José Prol, allowed the police to discover the insurrectional plans. Even though anarchists denied the accusations, saying that the bombs and propaganda materials found had been planted by the police themselves, the repression intensified and the Libertarian Communist Party dismantled. The upsurge in repression became particularly evident in the treatment given to the strikes of the Leopoldina Railway in Rio de Janeiro and the Companhia de Estradas de Mogiana in São Paulo. The strike by Leopoldina, which started on March 15, 1920, after the refusal of company leaders to negotiate the workers' claims, counted on the solidarity of workers organized in the Federation of Workers of Rio de Janeiro (FTRJ - successor to the UGT and heir to FORJ) and the Federation of Vehicle Drivers, who declared a general strike on March 23. On March 24, metallurgists, members of the Cosmopolitan Center, tailors, bakers, stokers, shoemakers, taxi drivers, weavers and a large number of construction workers also went on strike. During the stoppage, the headquarters of the FTRJ and other unions were invaded by the police and a series of workers' leaders were arrested, including Mâncio Teixeira, Fábio Luz, José Oiticica and Octávio Brandão.

Without the knowledge of the federations, but with the assent of part of the Leopoldina workers' leaders, reformist leaders negotiated with the government to end the strike, in exchange for promises to release prisoners, readmission of dismissed strikers and suspension of any other form of punishment. The anarchists accused the cooperative leaders of treason for having signed an agreement that ignored the conditions of Leopoldina workers, without having consulted the Federation of Workers and Leopoldina's employee unions. The Mogiana strike, which started on March 20 of the same year, was marked by open conflicts between workers and police. Shootings, sometimes fatal, took place at several railway stations serviced by the company. At the White House station, on March 31, police soldiers charged with a silent bayonet against more than 200 strikers, who entrenched themselves at the station and refused to evacuate it; in the shooting that took place, four strikers died and several were injured. The strike ended on April 5 with the arrest and deportation of workers involved in the conflicts. At the same time, a general strike initiated by FOSP in conjunction with the strike in Mogiana also ended in failure, ending on April 6 and with its leaders acknowledging "the unrest has not reached the desired proportions".

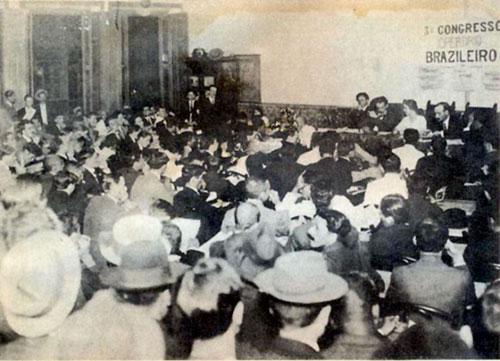
Closing session of the 3rd Brazilian Workers' Congress, chaired by Elvira Boni

Police repression, deportations and the systematic work of reformist and cooperative groups had been producing unfavorable results for revolutionary organizations directly linked to syndicalism. It was in this troubled situation that, between April 23 and 30, 1920, the 3rd Brazilian Workers' Congress took place. The meetings took place at the headquarters of the Union of Workers in Fabric Factories, with the presence of 116 delegates from 64 entities from various parts of the country. At this congress, as a symptom of the adaptation to the new post-war Brazilian industry framework, a resolution was approved that prioritized the creation of unions by industry, to the detriment of organization by trades. Many of the decisions of previous Congresses, of 1906 and 1913, were reiterated, such as the adoption of the federative method of organization. The Civil Construction Workers League of São Paulo, represented by Deoclécio Fagundes and Teófilo Ferreira, proposed that the congress join the Communist International. But Edgard Leuenroth objected, as it was not "a genuinely union organization", being supported by Astrojildo Pereira and José Elias. Instead of joining the Communist International, the 3rd Workers' Congress passed a resolution in which it welcomed the Russian Revolution and the initiatives taken carried out by the Communist International.

Finally, an Executive Committee of the Third Congress (CETC) was appointed in order to coordinate activities for the execution of the Resolutions taken, being assigned a mandate that would go on until the meeting of the Four Brazilian Workers' Congress, scheduled for 1921 and that did not end up. Rio de Janeiro would host a general secretariat, comprising a secretary general (Edgard Leuenroth), treasurer and five itinerant secretaries, responsible for the five geographic areas into which the country was divided. The itinerant secretaries were Domingos Passos (Center), José Elias da Silva (North), Jorge Adalberto de Jesus (Far North), Teófilo Ferreira (South) and Alberto Lauro (Far South). The Congress also decided to instruct the CETC to enter into agreements with the associations of maritime and railway workers in order to obtain a formal commitment from them that they would refuse to transport the deported workers, and was instructed to promote a South American Workers' Congress and to maintain contact with international federations that agreed with the union orientation followed by the 3rd Brazilian Workers' Congress.

=== Repression and disputes with the Communist Party of Brazil (PCB) ===
The year following the 3rd Brazilian Workers 'Congress began a period of general dismantling of the workers' organization. The Brazilian economy retreated and two especially repressive laws were enacted by Epitácio Pessoa: Decree No. 4,247 of January 6, 1921, by Arnolfo Rodrigues de Azevedo, which regulated the expulsions of foreigners who were in the country for less than five years, stipulating that they could be expelled from national territory if they were considered harmful to public order; and Decree No. 4,269, by Adolfo Gordo, with the express purpose of repressing anarchism, establishing prison sentences for crimes committed with a view to subversion of the social order and punishments for those who contributed to the practice of such crimes through meetings or propaganda instruments, in addition to giving the authorities the right to indefinitely close unions and civil entities that committed acts deemed harmful to public security. The workers' press also demonstrated a frank decline in 1921, with the end of several publications and the reduction of the periodicity of others. A Plebe went from June to September with no publication.

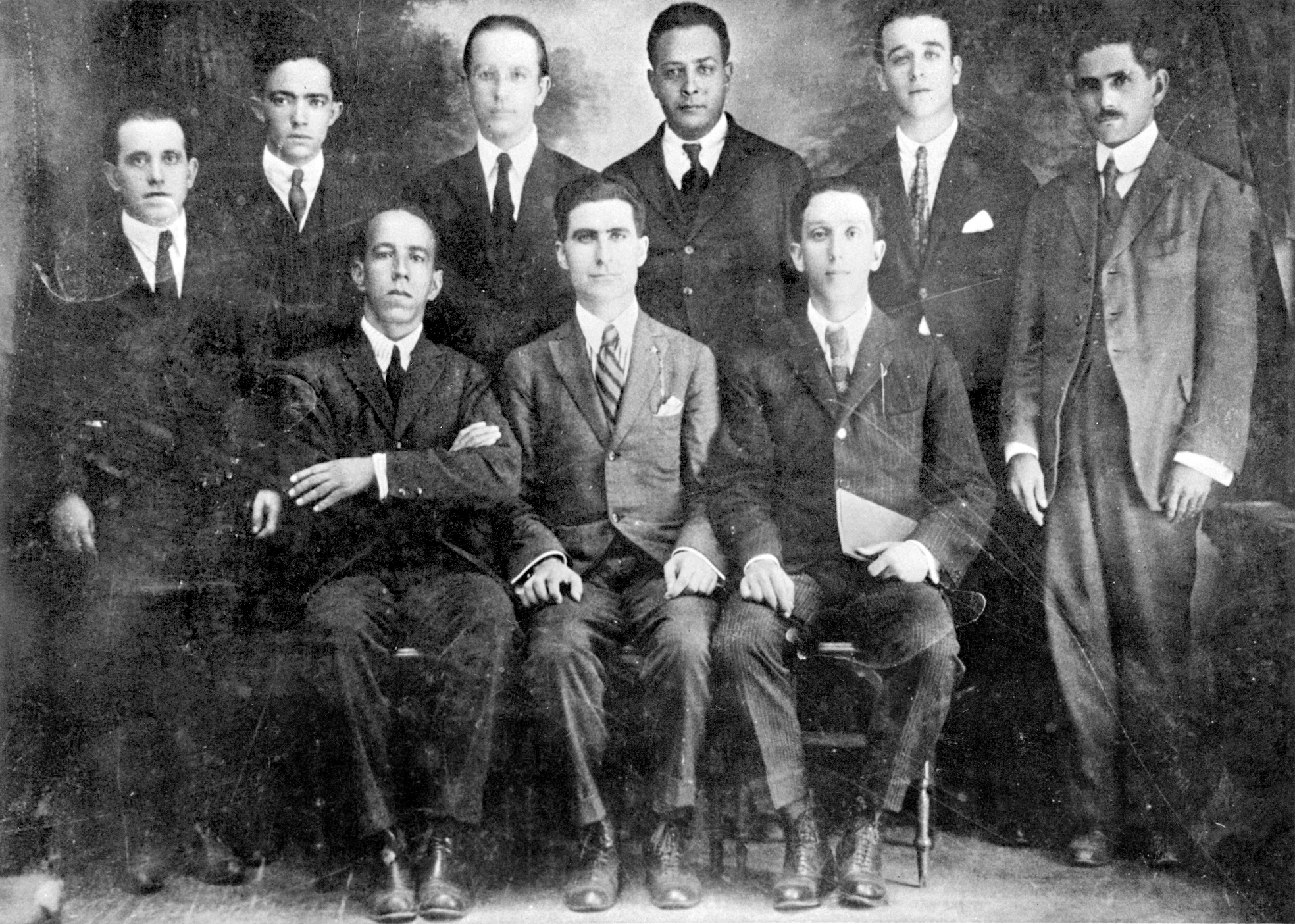
Founders of the Communist Party of Brazil (PCB), in 1922. Among them, there were former anarchist militants, such as Astrogildo Pereira, João da Costa Pimenta and José Elias da Silva

At the same time, the workers' movement was going through an ideological crisis. The federative model and the strategies of revolutionary syndicalism came to be criticized by some militants, such as Astrogildo Pereira, who defend a syndicalism along the lines of the Industrial Workers of the World (IWW), organized in a more centralized way, forming “one big union of all workers, with a single secretariat, a single source of propaganda, a single coordination center.” Some anarchists, realizing the lack of a methodical and systematic action in the work of propaganda and organization, started to stimulate the formation of libertarian affinity groups. As news of the Russian Revolution reached Brazil, the latent differences between anarchism and Bolshevism became clearer to workers' militants. In March 1922, Astrojildo Pereira and other former anarchist militants founded the Communist Party of Brazil (PCB). The founding of the PCB generated a division in the workers' movement, although initially the Communists only exercised influence in Rio de Janeiro. Following the recommendations of the Third International, the Communists insisted on a united front policy, establishing an alliance with the CSCB cooperatives, established in 1923 and lasting until 1925, in order to combat the influence of anarchism in the unions. It also oversaw the creation of organized communist factions, which formed oppositions in the unions under the control of anarchists, and which, even in the event of defeat in the union elections, remained active.

New elements started to influence the Brazilian political situation. On July 5, 1922, there was the 18 of the Copacabana Fort revolt, beginning the tenentist movement, led by the soldiers of the middle layers of the military hierarchy dissatisfied with the regime. Military conspirators came to seek the support of José Oiticica in organizations under anarchist influence and initiated contacts with Evaristo de Morais and Sarandy Raposo, whose CSBC supposedly exercised control of the railroad workers and miners of the three southern states from the country. The collusion was denounced by spies of the Chief of Police, Carneiro da Fontoura. As a result, several Army and Navy officers were arrested. In search of evidence against the suspected military, the police raided the home of oppositionist Evaristo Dias, arresting him and confiscating his books and papers, which were not returned to him. Other prisoners in Rio de Janeiro were Luís Peres, Octávio Brandão, José Gonçalves, Antônio de Oliveira, Pedro Maurini, Vicente Llorca, Silvano Borges and Joaquim Silva. When the General Union of Employees in Hotels and Restaurants called a meeting against the arrest of Pedro Maurini, an anarchist born abroad, the police raided the headquarters of the entity; shortly afterwards, the police also closed the headquarters of the Union of Workers in Civil Construction, where they arrested Florentino de Carvalho. With the inauguration of the President Artur Bernardes, the Press Law was passed, which prescribed punishments for offenses made in newspapers to the President of the Republic, to "public morals or good manners", as well as to "some sovereign, foreign head of state or their diplomatic representatives". The 4th Auxiliary Police Bureau was also created, with the specific objective of social and political control of militants opposed to the regime.

In July 1924, the retired general Isidoro Dias Lopes led a revolt in São Paulo, in a movement that had the support of the state public force, commanded by Major Miguel Costa. On July 8, the rebels forced the governor Carlos de Campos and the loyalist troops to flee the capital. Isidoro supplied weapons and incorporated a large number of foreign workers into his forces, especially those most experienced in European theater during the First World War. The anarchists of São Paulo, in a meeting with Pedro Augusto Motta, recognized that the military uprising had not been carried out by the people. However, they established a link between their character and popular desires. Examining the fact that they did not have sufficient strength, among the working and popular classes, to make their own revolution, they decided to participate in the movement, in an attempt to influence it; they soon offered to take up arms, proposing the formation of battalions of autonomous civilians, without military discipline and interference. Isidoro, heeding the warnings of José Carlos de Macedo Soares regarding the infiltration of radical elements, absolutely rejected the proposal of the anarchists. The proposal rejected, the anarchists sent a "Motion of the Militant Workers" to the Committee of the Revolutionary Forces, with 28 signatures, published in A Plebe of July 25, 1924. The motion proposed the fixing of a minimum wage and a maximum price table, the right to found schools, the right to association for all working classes, the freedom of the working press, the generalization of the eight-hour working day and the repeal of the expulsion law on political and social issues.

As a result of the unrest in São Paulo, Congress declared a state of emergency for 60 days in the Federal Capital and in the states of Rio de Janeiro and São Paulo, authorizing the President to extend it to other parts of the national territory. As a result, the most active unions were closed and the anarchist newspapers were prevented from circulating. José Oiticica was detained, still during the revolt in São Paulo, when he left the Colégio Pedro II, and then he was sent to improvised prison facilities on islands in Guanabara Bay; Domingos Passos, Domingos Brás and other anarchist workers, were incarcerated in the Fourth Auxiliary Police Station; the São Paulo libertarians who signed the "Movement of Militant Workers" were persecuted and arrested.

Some anarchist militants, such as Domingos Passos, Domingos Brás, Pedro A. Motta, José Maria Fernandes Varella, Nicolau Paradas, Nino Martins and José Alves do Nascimento, were sent to the penal colony of Clevelândia, on the border with French Guiana, with ordinary prisoners, unemployed and rebel soldiers. Survivors from Clevelândia reported having experienced unsanitary situations, hunger, torture and forced labor. In four years, of the 946 prisoners sent there, 491 died, including the anarchist militants Pedro A. Motta and José Alves do Nascimento. Some, like Domingos Brás and Domingos Passos, managed to escape, crossing the river Oiapoque, arriving on the side of French Guiana and leaving for Belém do Pará. Both militants who died in Clevelândia and survivors of the penal colony were later remembered as martyrs by Brazilian anarchists.

At the same time that Bernardes repressed the workers' movement in general, and anarchism in particular, he also took some steps in the field of social legislation, creating a National Labor Council and a post of Special Curator of Accidents at Work, for the provision of free medical assistance for victims of occupational accidents; enacted laws regulating assistance and protection for the least abandoned and delinquent and prohibiting the work of minors under the age of 14; in addition to enacting a vacation law, which obliged commercial, industrial and banking establishments to grant their employees 15 days of paid vacation annually. It was also the government of Artur Bernardes who called a meeting to designate a representative of the working class at the International Labor Conference in 1926, which ended up appointing the anarchist Carlos Dias to represent the Brazilian workers in Geneva. This indication was the target of criticism by Brazilian communists. Carlos Dias, after returning from Geneva in August 1926, considered the Conference useless, as the various representative countries did not ratify its resolutions.

During the persecutions of anarchists in São Paulo and Rio de Janeiro, communists were less targeted by repression, and were able to hold, in February 1925, the 2nd PCB Congress. In the same period, the communists began to publish the journal A Classe Operária, and managed to maintain their union publications, such as O Internacional, throughout the state of siege. Especially in Rio de Janeiro, the communists started to work in the unions where the anarchists had previously had greater influence. With the end of the state of siege in 1926, the anarchist periodical A Plebe was published again in February 1927. Anarchists soon sought to retake their place in the unions and refounded the old associations where they were active and which had been closed by repression. In this context, the dispute for the control of workers' organizations intensified again.

The polarization between communists and anarchists occurred mainly in Rio de Janeiro and São Paulo. In Rio de Janeiro, the 1st Regional Union Congress, organized by 9 labor unions communist influence, gave rise to the Regional Union Federation of Rio de Janeiro, bringing together delegates from 33 unions, 22 workers' commissions and 3 union minorities. Under the FORJ coordination, a meeting was held to discuss the vacation law on the same days as the congress convened by the communists, with the participation of only 4 permanent unions, including the Alliance of Workers in Footwear, the Union of Smelters and Attachments, the Union of Workers in Civil Construction and the Workers' Center in Quarries. The affirmation of anarchist principles was reinforced in opposition to the communist proposals, refusing support for political parties and workers' centralization by external bodies, defending federalism and direct action without intermediaries. In São Paulo, the rearticulation of the workers' movement took place around the Pro-Organization of the Workers' Commission, constituted in a rally on May 1, 1927, with a view to reorganizing the old FOSP, which only reappeared in 1931. On May 7, the Workers' Union of Various Crafts was created, as an embryonic form of the federation. There were few unions that were active: União dos Canteiros, União dos Hateiros, União dos Artífices em Calçados and Liga Operária de Vila Esperança, among the unions under anarchist influence. The International, which was the Union of Employees in Hotels and Restaurants, and the Union of Graphic Workers (UTG) were under communist leadership, while in the Union of Workers in Fabric Factories there were disputes between anarchists and communists. In Rio Grande do Sul, in contrast, the 3rd State Workers' Congress of 1925, organized by FORGS and with the participation of 18 unions from various cities in the State, adopted a motion reaffirming libertarian principles and the fight against political parties.

Despite union disputes, the vacation law, regulated by the government of Artur Bernardes in 1926, acted as an agglutinating element among workers' militants. Several strikes from 1926 onwards demanded the application of this law, which, despite being approved and regulated, was practically not fulfilled. A Vacation Law Committee was created in São Paulo, bringing together unions and activists of different trends, including anarchists, communists, Catholics and reformists. In the same period, there was an intense protest mobilization provoked by the trial and execution of the anarchist workers Sacco and Vanzetti, accused by the American justice system of assault and murder. Driven by the international movement, in early 1926, a Sacco and Vanzetti Pro-Freedom Agitation Committee was created in a general assembly of shoemakers. The campaign was intensified with constant public demonstrations of great amplitude throughout the country.

There were other, less extensive demonstrations of protest against the so-called "Celerated Law" of August 1927. This criminal law was in force until 1930, demobilizing the unions under anarchist influence, who found no alternative action in the face of the strengthening of repressive forces, which again interfered in the union space. The "Celerada Law", passed in the government of Washington Luís - which was already disliked by the workers' leaders for having once stated that “the social issue in Brazil is a police issue" - made the crimes of "diverting workers from the establishments where they are employed, through threats and embarrassment", unaffordable, as well as those of “causing cessation or suspension of work through threats or violence, to impose on workers or bosses an increase or decrease in service or salary”, in addition to authorizing the government to indefinitely close the associations, unions, centers or entities of the workers' movement that focused on the practice of crimes or acts contrary to public order. Soon after the law was passed, the police arrested 14 workers in São Paulo, among them, the anarchists Edgard Leuenroth and Domingos Passos and the communist Aristides Lobo.

Gradually, the PCB was taking the lead in the organizational activities of the workers and their political representation. Thus, in 1927, in the midst of intense police persecution, the campaign of the Workers and Peasants' Bloc (BOC) managed to elect, with the support of the communists and several unions in Rio de Janeiro, the candidates Azevedo Lima, Minervino de Oliveira and Octávio Brandão. In 1928, when anarchism was in decline in Rio de Janeiro, the rivalry between anarchists and communists spawned two fatalities in a conflict at the headquarters of the Union of Graphics. Azevedo Lima had accused the president of the Union of Workers in Fabric Factories, Joaquim Pereira de Oliveira, of involvement with the Rio police. Thus, on February 14, at the headquarters of the Graphics, there was a meeting to clarify the complaint. Right at the beginning of the activities, the light was turned off and, after shots fired by members of the assistance, 10 workers were injured and two died, among them, the graphic designer José Leite and the anarchist shoemaker Antônio Dominguez. The shots were allegedly taken by communists Pedro Bastos and Eusébio Manjon. Dominguez's death worsened relations between anarchists and communists.

In Rio Grande do Sul, unlike Rio de Janeiro and São Paulo, the presence of communists was not decisive and the persecutions against anarchists were not as intense. Thus, Rio Grande do Sul became a focus of anarchist resistance at the end of the First Republic, maintaining the organizational traditions of a libertarian character and enabling publications and centers of doctrinal propaganda. In January 1930, a Regional Anarchist Congress was held in the state.

=== Schools and cultural events ===
A wide range of cultural and associative manifestations of the working class was revealed during the First Republic. Dancing, carnival, musical and sports associations emerged, as well as schools and social studies centers. In order to propagate their ideals and reaffirm their libertarian identity, anarchists became involved in a series of forms of action that had in culture, education and leisure the main instruments of doctrinal propaganda. In this way, many of these cultural expressions of workers of the First Republic were closely related to the proposals for social and intellectual emancipation defended by anarchists. Even some libertarian militants, such as Oreste Ristori and Maria Lacerda de Moura, who condemned trade unionism for seeing it as a reformist character, dedicated their activities essentially to initiatives in the field of advertising and education. COB itself, in turn, recommended the creation of educational centers and rationalist schools as a significant part of the work for the social revolution.

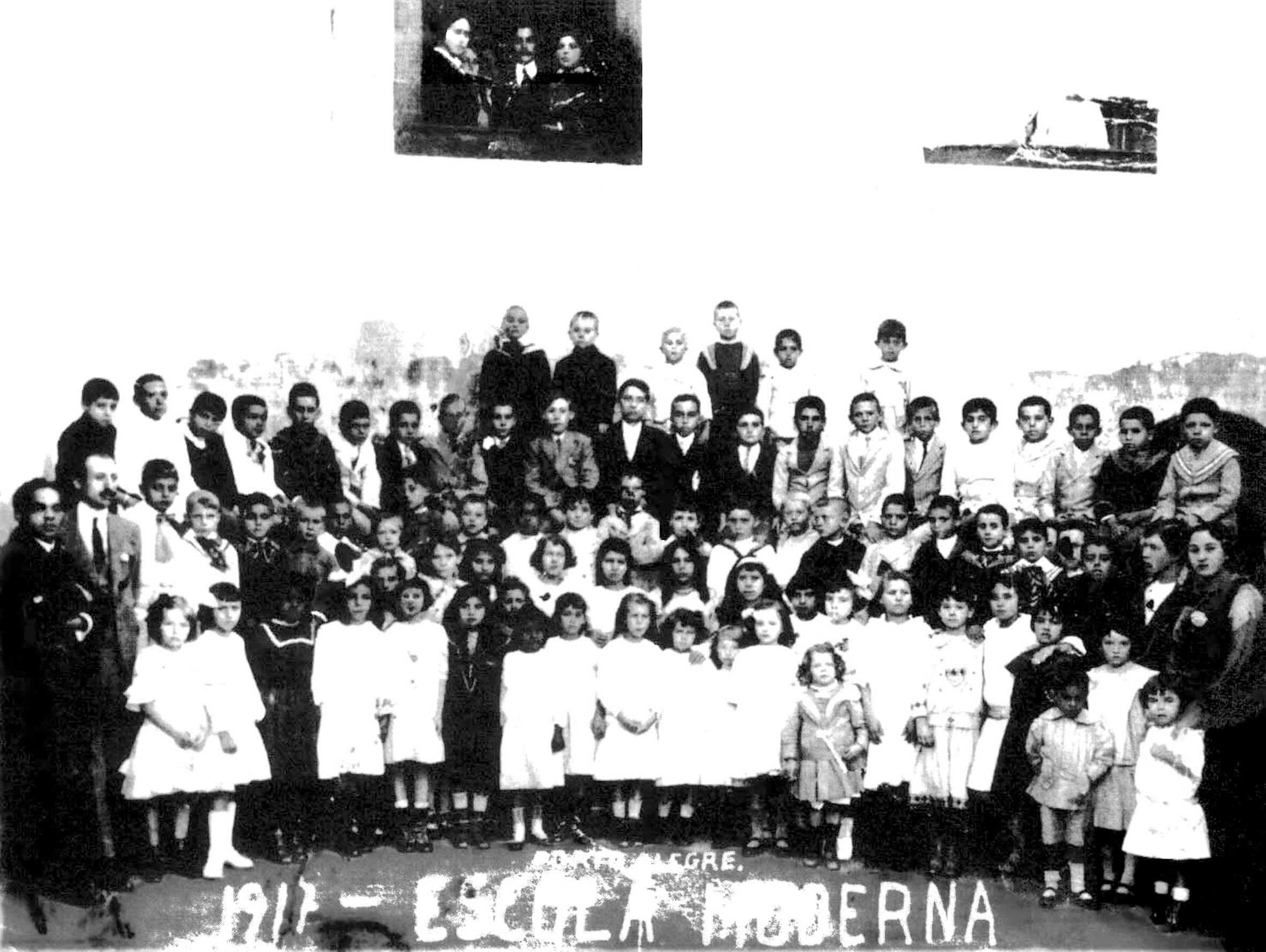
Teachers and students of the Modern School of Porto Alegre in 1917. On the left are Zenon de Almeida and Djalma Fetterman, and on the right, the sisters Espertirina and Eulina Martins

The first libertarian schools emerged to meet the needs of workers in the field of education. The influence of Francesc Ferrer i Guardia's rationalist pedagogy was decisive in the educational initiatives promoted by anarchists in that period, pointing out what they consider "the negative effects of a controlling and disciplining education, for creating submissive individuals, without initiative, without autonomy", and proposed, instead, an education with new objects, principles and methods, which sought to stimulate originality, initiative, responsibility and autonomy. Countless Modern Schools existed during the First Republic, like Escola 1º de Maio, founded in 1908 and directed by Pedro Matera in Rio de Janeiro; the Escola Eliseu Réclus, founded in 1906 in Porto Alegre and directed by Djalma Fettermann; Escola Nova, founded in 1909 in São Paulo; among others. Most schools were maintained by workers and the discipline regime followed established priorities to achieve intellectual independence and the capacity for individual and collective organization. Women anarchists, in turn, formed several groups of female education free from the religious influence present in women's education during that period, creating reading rooms and literacy rooms, such as the Centro Feminino de Educação, founded in 1920 by Isabel Cerruti. In the same vein as the Modern Schools were the Centers for Social Studies, intended for the dissemination of lectures and the teaching shared between the members. Such centers were simpler to be implanted than the Modern Schools, being enough to rent or assign a room and hire or invite a speaker.

Another visible expression of worker culture in that period was the militant press, which became the main instrument of propaganda and debate. The newspaper was seen as an important means of information, awareness and mobilization, and the recipient was not considered a passive element, but someone who had common interests and was inserted in the same spaces of organization and militancy. In this way, the journals were fed up material on the workers' movement and related news, composed of reports from the unions, personal letters, denunciations, among others. The working and anarchist press, however, was unable to find any regular in its distribution; more than once newspapers disappeared from circulation. Some never reappeared, others, like A Plebe, had a longer life span, but circulated with great intervals. This irregular life was mainly due to financial difficulties and persecution. The periodicity of anarchist and workers' newspapers was also determined by events; weekly newspapers could be circulated daily, keeping the regular numbering and the same heading. This was especially the case in times of strike unrest. Also noteworthy was the absence of advertising and, at certain times, boycott recommendations, usually when the company responsible for the boycotted products was in dispute with its workers. Often, the headquarters of the associations or even the newsrooms of the newspapers provided free access to both the periodical press and books and pamphlets in the so-called "reading tables". The practice of creating libraries and reading rooms, which will be a constant in the workers 'movement of the First Republic, had been a recommendation of the Workers' Congress of 1906, in the hope that the availability of this literature would contribute to adding workers to the movement.

Together with the militant press, the workers' theater was seen as an important means of propagating libertarian ideas. In this sense, several amateur theater groups were formed, which enacted plays of a political and social nature, such as Primo Maggio by Pietro Gori and The Tenants Strike by Neno Vasco. Working societies also developed a calendar of celebrations and ceremonies, which became an essential element of militant culture. This calendar included dates such as the foundation anniversary of each society; the 14th of July, celebrating the fall of the Bastille and the French Revolution; the 13th of October, anniversary of Francesc Ferrer's execution by firing squad; and the 1st of May, considered the most important date, inseparable from the struggle for the eight-hour workday. On these occasions, advertising conferences were held at the headquarters of the associations or in rented halls, usually with a speaker invited to speak about the date or some related topic. Except for the 1st of May, which soon acquired a public dimension, there was a predominance of celebrations in closed places until the end of the 1910s. In the second half of the 1910s, it became common to organize recreational activities and festivals, held outdoors, in places such as parks, and including various attractions in the program, such as the staging of plays, soirees, balls and picnics. These activities were generally organized as a way of raising funds for the press or workers' organizations.

The involvement of intellectuals with the workers' movement was significant in Brazil. Writers like Elísio de Carvalho, Fábio Luz, Curvelo de Mendonça, Avelino Fóscolo and Lima Barreto were involved with anarchism, and wrote works whose focus was on the social issue. Notorious anarchist militants also stood out as intellectuals, such as José Oiticica, philologist and professor at Colégio Pedro II and Neno Vasco, who graduated in law at the University of Coimbra.

== Vargas Era (1930–1945) ==
The anarchists' attitude towards the Revolution of 1930 initially presented itself as a reaction of indifference. Due to the movement's political-party character, anarchists, who claimed to be apolitical, saw it as a simple change of government that would not affect the working condition. There was, however, a certain ambiguity when, following portions of the population, they enthusiastically supported social change while rejecting militant support, as assessed by the newspaper O Trabalhador, a FOSP organ:

The people, although not believing in the promises that the revolutionaries made to them, did not for that reason cease to admire with sympathy the fall of the oligarchy, for the simple fact that this fall had been disputed, with blood on the battlefields.

Edgard Leuenroth affirmed that anarchists had a certain participation in the revolutionary movement of 1930, holding meetings and launching manifestos to the revolutionaries and the population. Leuenroth himself published, with the help of a revolutionary lieutenant, a clandestine newspaper entitled Liberdade. After the revolution, the workers' movement declared a series of strikes in São Paulo, initiated by the weavers, who were followed by several other sectors, demanding the replacement of salary discounts imposed because of the Great Depression. The strikes, which lasted through the months of November and December, revealed an expectation of an immediate resolution of the situation in which the workers were faced by the new government that was installed.

Organizations for the agglutination of workers were formed in the first half of 1930, such as the Provisional Committee for Union Reorganization in São Paulo. Everardo Dias reported, in his memoirs, the surprising influx of workers to the committee meeting, with the intention, at first, of avoiding ideological divergences, bringing together anarchists, communists and reformists. However, the divergences soon reappeared, so that the anarchists founded, on November 16, 1930, the Workers' Organization Committee, aiming at reactivating the old FOSP. The consolidation of FOSP took place through the 3rd State Workers Conference, between March 13 and 15, 1931, with the participation of 18 unions, 10 from the capital and 8 from the interior of São Paulo. All participating associations were under anarchist influence, with the exception of the Union of Graphic Workers of São Paulo (UGT), then run by Trotskyites. Under the influence of weaver José Righetti, a former anarchist converted to tenentism, the Union of Workers in Fabric Factories (UOFT) and the League of Construction Workers (LOCC) refused to participate in FOSP. Weavers, being the most numerous sector at the time, were constantly targeted by anarchist propaganda through newsletters. LOCC would later join FOSP.

The government of Getúlio Vargas soon launched a labor law, seeking to attract the support of workers, and created the Ministry of Labor, Industry and Commerce, responsible for enforcing labor legislation and for organizing official unionization. In March 1931, a unionization law was launched, which established the official recognition of only one union per sector and prohibited political and religious advertising within the unions. At the same time, repression of the press and workers' demonstrations was still widespread. In Rio de Janeiro, it was alleged that a bomb exploded in the Central Police building and, in São Paulo, an uprising of young officers from the Public Force to prevent the May 1 rallies in 1931. There were also constant harassments of the anarchist newspapers The Lantern and The Plebe. Thus, in parallel to the recently launched labor legislation, the State maintained its practice of control and repression to weaken dissident groups, essentially anarchists and communists.

In addition to their work in unions, anarchists continued to undertake cultural and educational initiatives. In 1933, the Center for Social Culture (CCS) was founded in São Paulo, with the intention of creating a space for the promotion of debates and discussions. Also in São Paulo in 1934, the Escola Moderna was refounded and evening classes were promoted by the anarchists in the unions. In other locations, such as Belém do Pará, the Escola Racional Francisco Ferrer was installed and, in Garanhuns, Pernambuco, a night school was created at the Civil Construction Union, based on rationalist teachings.

=== Combating integralism ===
During the 1930s, one of the main concerns of anarchists during this period was the rise of fascism in Brazil, represented by Brazilian Integralist Action (AIB), founded in 1932, and consequently, the attempt to create means for promoting anti-fascist resistance. Although they had little expression in the Italian anti-fascist community, where socialist positions predominated, anarchists developed a series of activities of an anti-fascist character, such as rallies, meetings and public actions.

The first reported anti-fascist activities in which anarchists took part date from 1932. In general, they were meetings promoted by anarchist or socialist groups, almost always in memory of Giacomo Matteotti or Errico Malatesta, which were highlighted personalities of Italian antifascism. On December 19, 1932, Edgard Leuenroth and Maria Lacerda de Moura spoke at a meeting held by an Italian socialist group in memory of Matteotti and on behalf of his wife and children, who were being prevented from leaving Italy.

From 1933, a period marked by the first integralist march held in São Paulo and also by the emergence of the Anti-fascist United Front (FUA) and the World Committee Against War and Fascism, the anarchists intensified their activities around anti-fascism. During the month of June 1933, anarchists began to transmit, through their periodicals, a news series about the anti-fascist organization that was beginning to gain momentum in São Paulo. One of the first initiatives of some libertarians was the creation of an Anti-Fascist Committee, which started to publish a series of manifestos in the anarchist press and also held some meetings. The Anti-Fascist Committee, with the anarchists of São Paulo in front of it, was created on June 22, 1933, through an assembly in the Celso Garcia Hall, which featured Edgard Leuenroth and José Oiticica as main speakers. However, this committee did not survive long, remaining active only for a few months. After the dissolution of the Antifascist Committee, it was up to the CCS to organize rallies and antifascist conferences.

Anarchists were invited by Trotskyists to participate in meetings with other groups of the left, in order to seek to establish a joint action in the anti-fascist struggle; but they ended up opposing any possibility of acting regularly in the FUA, an initiative driven by the Communist League (LC). The anarchists were present at the founding meeting of FUA, defending a front of struggle that was formed through the union of all anti-fascist individuals and, “on the basis of the broadest and most complete autonomy of factions, principles and doctrines that subdivides men into clubs, legions, parties and dissidents”. The other organizations that made up the FUA, in turn, defended the idea of a single front that would bring together the various left-wing parties and unions, rather than isolated anti-fascist individuals. For anarchists, this was seen as an incongruity, as a large part of these organizations were very insignificant. Despite this, libertarians maintained contacts and several times articulated with the FUA, which did not happen in relation to the Committee Against War and Fascism, led by the PCB.

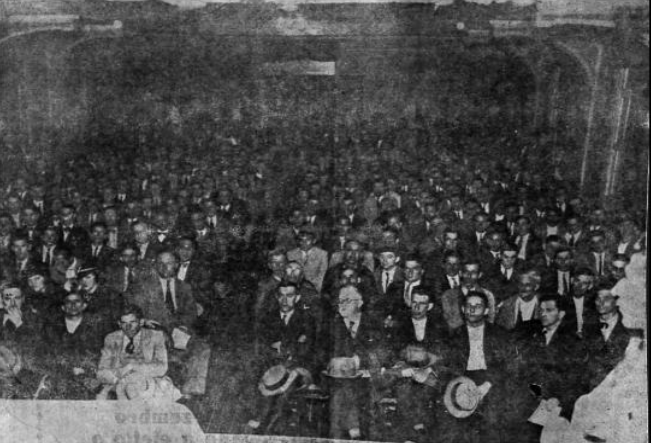
Anti-Integralist Conference held on November 14, 1933, in the hall of the Union of the Working Classes

On November 14, 1933, the anarchists, through the CCS, organized an anti-integralist conference, which included the participation of representatives of different political currents of the left, such as the socialist Carmelo Crispino, the anarchist Hermínio Marcos and a representative of the newspaper O Homem Livre, press agency of the FUA. The event, held in the hall of the União das Classes Laboriosas, brought together a large audience composed of men and women belonging to the most diverse ideological currents, but who were grouped there by the same ideal of fighting against integralism. In the middle of the conference, some integralists appeared in order to disrupt it, however, when they realized the amount of antifascist elements that were there, they withdrew and began to look for reinforcements in the mediations, being repelled by a group of workers.

In 1934, conflicts between integralists and antifascists intensified, culminating, on October 7, in Battle of Praça da Sé. On that day, the AIB intended to hold a public demonstration in Praça da Sé in honor of the second anniversary of the Integralist Manifesto, but the capital's anti-fascist forces soon mobilized to jointly prevent the event. The front that was organized to put an end to the integralist rally was quite diverse in ideological tendencies, bringing together anarchists, socialists, Trotskyists, communists and other leftist tenants. Anarchists played a fundamental role in the organization of the movement, giving up the FOSP headquarters for some meetings, which counted the active participation of notorious militants such as Edgard Leuenroth, Juan Perez Bouzas, Pedro Catalo and Jaime Cubero. During the confrontation, anarchists battled violently against integralists and the police. The conflict ended with the general stampede of the integralists, who abandoned their green shirts on the streets of downtown São Paulo, to avoid further aggression.

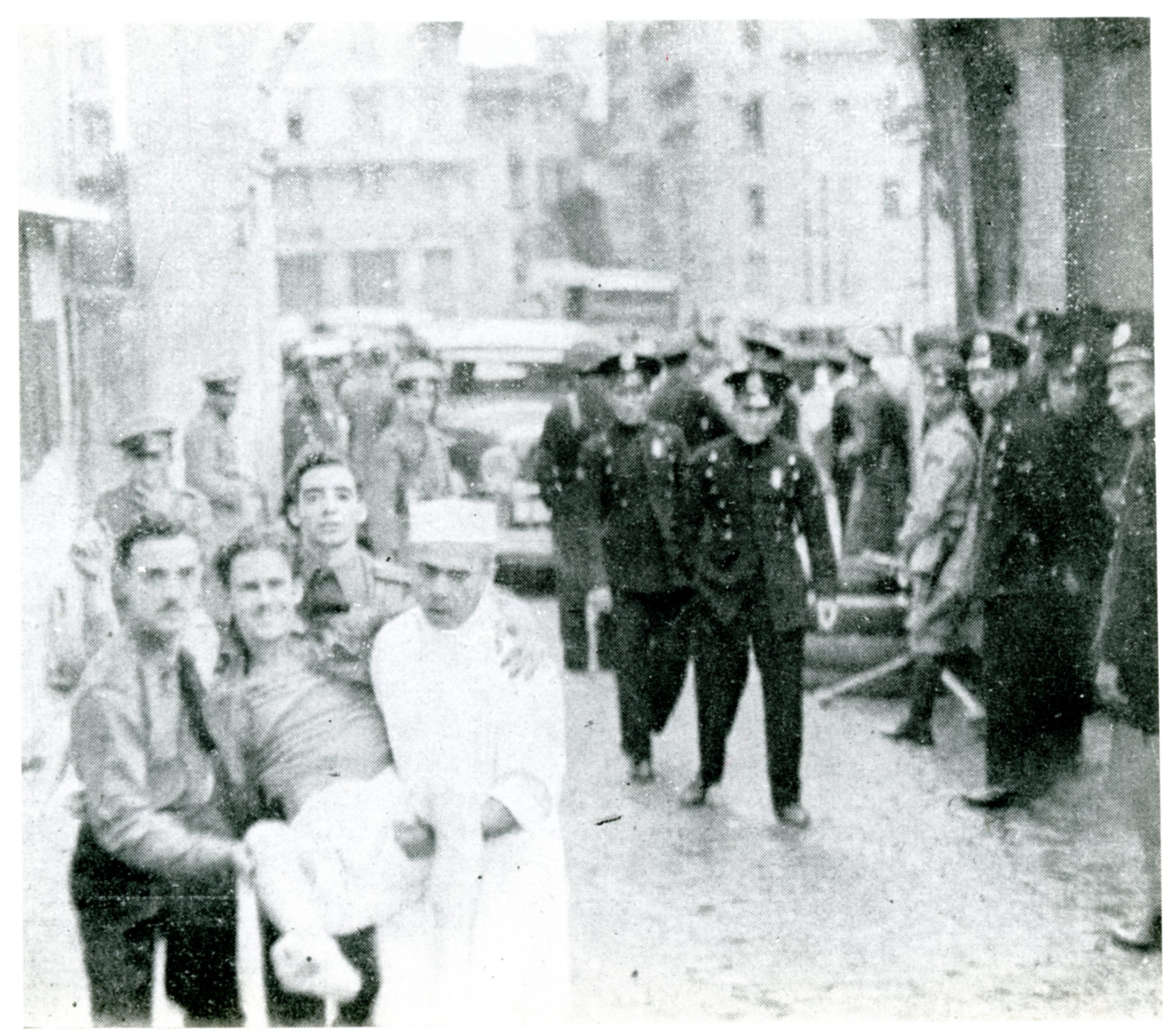
Integralist injured during Battle of Praça da Sé, carried by comrades

As a result of the violent struggle between anti-fascists and integralists, the anarchists and the other left groups that took part in the combat were targets of intense persecution. The police imprisoned several libertarian militants and the FOSP headquarters itself was invaded and sealed by the authorities. Anarchists subsequently tried to reorganize the FOSP and seek ways to help the militants who were arrested as a result of the anti-fascist struggle, even creating the Social Prisoners Committee, which carried out some festive activities aimed at raising aid funds for incarcerated comrades and their families.

In March 1935, some left-wing tenentist sectors and political groups linked to communists and socialists founded the National Liberation Alliance (ALN). The ALN's political program, aimed at combating the latifundium, imperialism and in defense of freedoms, added to the struggle that its sections across the country were developing against the integralists, received the admiration of the anarchists. However, in July 1935, the ANL invited the various anti-fascist and workers' organizations to participate in an anti-integralist rally that would take place in São Paulo. The anarchists of A Plebe refused the invitation and explained that, although they saw the ALN struggle positively, they could not agree with that organization, because, for the sake of coherence with libertarian principles, they would never make commitments to a political organization, even if in an eventual way. The same position was presented by FOSP, who reported that its antipolitical principles prevented it from entering into any kind of commitment to the ALN or any other political organization. In general, the anarchists gave support to the ALN, but not adhesions, because, although there were some points of ideological contact between the anarchists and the alliance, there was mistrust in relation to the presence of Luís Carlos Prestes, acclaimed as president of the ALN, as well as the fear that, over time, this organization could seek institutional political power. Even though adherence did not occur, anarchists showed solidarity with the ALN when it was outlawed by the Vargas government in July 1935, and its sections and militants were largely repressed.

The anti-fascist struggle developed by the anarchists was dismantled after November 1935. The Communist uprising of 1935 was used as a pretext by the government to initiate a broad repression against the left, such that communists, democrats and opponents to the Vargas government in general were violently repressed. Anarchists, even though they did not participate in the uprisings, were not spared from repression; many militants, such as Leuenroth and Rodolpho Felippe, were arrested, libertarian newspapers were jammed and several unions linked to FOSP had their headquarters invaded and closed by police forces.

=== Crisis of revolutionary syndicalism ===
Despite the embezzlement resulting from the police repression and the internal purges that the party carried out, redirecting itself to a workers' policy that favored the workers' leaders, the PCB organized, in São Paulo, a Union Conference and a Regional Conference, in November 1931. At these conferences, the thesis proposed by Leôncio Basbaum was approved, which directed the party's actions towards existing unions, even if they were official ones, instead of creating new unions, which intensified the friction with anarchists. The official unions expanded, causing competition and the emptying of independent unions, mainly in Rio de Janeiro, where several sectors rushed to request the letter of recognition early in 1931. Among the construction workers and shoemakers, the recognized unions vied for space with the anarchists. On the other hand, in São Paulo, the aversion to officialization was demonstrated to the Minister of Labor, Lindolfo Collor, through protests and boos in a meeting with communist and anarchist workers in the Hall of the Laborious Class in 1931. The anarchists who militated in the FOSP identified the Brazilian corporatist project with that of other authoritarian regimes, denouncing the creation of the Ministry of Labor as a fascist strategy, and constantly denounced its weaknesses. At the same time, they urged workers to conquer, through direct action, their social rights that were guaranteed by labor legislation, but which in practice were not fulfilled.

In 1931, only two unions asked for officialization in São Paulo, that of bank workers, in the capital, and that of workers at Companhia Docas, in Santos, while in the Federal District, 21 unions were recognized. Only in 1933 did an expressive adherence to officialization take place in São Paulo, reaching the number of 52 unions. However, a certain artificiality was perceived in these adhesions, since the number of official unions did not necessarily mean their control by the State. In several sectors, officializations were carried out through associations without representation. There were unions in São Paulo with about 50 members, as was the case with the hatmakers and slaughterhouse workers in 1932, and the shoemakers and railway workers of the São Paulo Railway in 1933. In these categories, there were independent anarchist-oriented unions, the communists working in the latter, with intense demanding activities.

Initially, independent unions remained quite active in the labor movement. In May 1932, strikes took place in various union sectors, constituting a Strike Committee that brought together anarchists, communists, Trotskyists and reformists, a union that the FOSP was unable to achieve by calling for a general strike against Professional Portfolios. With the Constitutionalist Revolution, union activities from July to September were paralyzed, however, there were controversies regarding the position of workers in relation to the movement centered on São Paulo. According to Florentino de Carvalho, part of the workers' movement supported and participated in the movement, but a considerable part remained indifferent, due to the anarchist political position.

In 1934, the government determined that workers, in order to reap the benefits of labor legislation, should join official unions. Anarchists sought to derail the project, which they considered corporate and fascist. The defense of union autonomy was carried out in an uncompromising manner by libertarians, who preferred to close their unions rather than give in to State interference. Despite the persistence of anarchists in maintaining the independent unions, several associations opted for the official route, as happened with the UTG Paulista, led by Trotskyists. The main factor that motivated the change of course was the conditioning of vacation days to the workers associated with a recognized union. In Rio Grande do Sul, in June 1934, the PCB obtained the leadership of FORGS, which had been reorganized by the anarchists in August of the previous year, and also constituted the Proletarian Electoral League and the Anti-War and Anti-Fascist Committee. With these organizations, the PCB, which for years tried to create bases in Rio Grande do Sul, managed to break the anarchist resistance that was already weakened due to disputes with official organizations. It was through the electoral appeal and the union against fascism that the communists were able to offer new channels of participation to the workers, questioning the limitation of the anarchists in this sense. The Paraná Workers' Federation (FOP), until then under anarchist influence, joined the official recognition in 1934.

There was an attempt on the part of libertarians from São Paulo to reorganize the former COB, with the support of independent unions in the capital and interior of São Paulo, the Union of Workers in Civil Construction of Recife, of the Federation of Anti-Political Proletarian Centers of Porto Alegre and of the Unique Union of Tailors of Uruguaiana. The pro-COB committee held meetings approving its statutes, but there was no further news about it after August 1934. The FOSP, the last bastion of revolutionary syndicalism, definitively ended its activities in November 1937, and the headquarters building was sealed by the police. Some anarchist-oriented unions made a brief comeback in 1937, before the institution of the Estado Novo, including the Union of Footwear Workers, the League of Workers in Civil Construction and the Union of Manipulators of bread. Bakers continued their activities, maintaining their libertarian statutes and their practice of direct action in negotiating with bakery owners. They carried out strikes in 1936 and 1937 and maintained the publication of their newspaper during that period. Under strict surveillance, in 1940 they would be pressured to give up the use of the title of "union", an exclusive prerogative of official associations.

The crisis of revolutionary syndicalism represented a crisis of anarchism itself, now without spaces for social insertion. The methods of direct action seemed more appropriate when there was no mediation of institutional apparatus for the resolution of conflicts between capital and labor. In addition, the intensification of police repression, especially after the Communist Uprising and with the proclamation of the Estado Novo; the questioning of direct action methods in the face of PCB discipline and centralization; and the lack of its own political organization to carry out its programmatic objectives, resulted in the decline of anarchism in Brazil.

== Populist period (1945–1964) ==
With the end of the Estado Novo in 1945 and the country's subsequent democratization, anarchists believed that this would be the time for a more organic articulation, forming specific political organizations and founding new journals, in an attempt to impress greater participation in Brazilian political life. The first anarchist newspaper to form was Remodelações, launched in Rio de Janeiro and coordinated by anarchists Moacir Caminha and Maria Iêda, on October 10, 1945, a few days after the end of the Getúlio Vargas dictatorship, and circulated weekly until 1947. With the reappearance of Ação Direta in 1946, also in Rio, Rio anarchists began to focus their efforts on the organization of only one journal. In São Paulo, anarchists resumed the publication of A Plebe in 1947. The anarchist press served, at that time, as an aggregating and dynamic element for a rearticulation of the dispersed militants. But financial difficulties caused A Plebe to end its activities 1951 and, in 1960, Ação Direta was replaced by the newspaper O Libertário, whose edition was motivated by the “imperative need to keep relations between libertarian activists alive”, in view of the end of previous publications and the absence of a greater organism.

The notion that the formation of a national organization would enable the development of its political actions was shared by militants from different cities and was part of a reflection that had been going on since previous decades, and it was mainly motivated by the holding of an international anarchist congress in France in 1946, in which questions regarding the anarchist organization were much debated. Brazilian anarchists wanted to overcome the experience of the First Republic, its performance was excessively focused on the union environment, believing, at that moment, that organized in specific instances, they could have a more coordinated impact on social movements and without losing sight of your final goals. Among the anarchist organizations created in the period, there were the Anarchist Union of Rio de Janeiro (UARJ), the Anarchist Union of São Paulo (UASP) and the group Os Ácratas de Porto Alegre. Soon the militants tried to organize a congress to rearticulate Brazilian anarchism, which was held in December 1948 and outlined the objectives and strategies to be followed by anarchists at that time. Despite the fundamental role of old militants such as Edgard Leuenroth and José Oiticica in the rearticulation of the anarchist movement, the presence of new militants, such as Adélcio Coppeli and Ideal Peres, who organized themselves in the União da Juventude Libertária Brasileira stood out and, later, in the Anarchist Youth of Rio de Janeiro (JARJ). The difficulty of reinsertion of anarchists in social movements contributed to hamper the survival of their specific organizations, which disappeared throughout the 1950s and 1960s.

=== Anarchist Congresses ===
Between 1945 and 1964 Brazilian anarchists held four congresses, in 1948, 1953, 1959 and 1963, respectively. If, on the one hand, each meeting was inserted in specific conjunctures, there was a permanent concern in trying to consolidate a political field with coherent proposals, in which the concern with the consolidation of its own political organization and the option for union action, together with the realization of cultural actions were constant. In addition, Brazilian anarchists sent delegates to the International Anarchist Congress of France in 1946, to the Congress of the Federación Obrera Regional Argentina (FORA) of 1948 and the American Anarchist Conference of 1957. In general, the congresses outlined political lines and forms of action for the anarchist militants, guaranteeing a more coordinated and reinforcing a common political instance.

The idea of organizing an Anarchist Congress was motivated by participation in the International Anarchist Congress of France in 1946 and in the FORA Congress in 1948. In the same year, the militants exchanged correspondence with comrades around Brazil. The call to the national anarchist congress was facilitated by the publication of the newspapers Remodelações, Ação Direta and A Plebe, and by the end of 1948, Brazilian anarchists had already sent reports and circulars for several states where there was a militant presence. Based on the information circulated and on the groups and activists that constituted the UARJ and UASP, they drew up the program for the 1948 Anarchist Congress. The congress was held from the 17th to the 19th of December 1948, coinciding with school holidays, which facilitated the participation of many activists who were students or teachers. The congress took place at Nossa Chácara, a place whose land had originally belonged to the lawyer and anarchist Benjamim Mota. The land had been handed over to Edgard Leuenroth, who gave up space for the common use of anarchists between 1939 and 1942. In addition to debates over reaffirming the ideological bases of anarchism, at the congress relations with other political elements, solidarity with the political exiles from Spain and Portugal, and the strategies that should have been adopted by anarchists at that time were also discussed. The general perception was that anarchists needed to organize themselves more efficiently in order to intervene properly as a political force, aiming at the foundation of a national organization, constituted in a federative way, from the bottom up. Regarding their political practices, the anarchists decided to continue their work within the unions, taking up more general elements of revolutionary syndicalism. Another topic discussed was the question of propaganda, and recommended the creation of cultural centers, recreational colonies, theater groups and publishers dedicated to the libertarian theme.

Five years later, in 1953, UARJ activists organized a new congress, which was scheduled for January 9, 10 and 11. A circular sent to different militants around Brazil presented the “need to activate our action more” and “everything else that refers to practical measures to give greater impetus to our movement”. The congress was held in Urca, in Rio de Janeiro, and issues such as organization, campaigns to be developed and propaganda were discussed, serving as a balance of anarchist activities carried out between the two congresses. The international articulation of the anarchist press and the penetration with the “companions of Rio Light” and in the “rail union” stood out as a positive point. The meeting also pointed out the activities of the UARJ and training and internal debates, headed by Ideal Peres. The reports from São Paulo highlighted the activities of the Centro de Cultura Social, Nossa Chácara and its theater group, and underlined the participation of a group of anarchists in the shoemakers union. It was decided to continue with the publication of Direct Action, in a rotating manner, and the reappearance of The Plebe was not mentioned. The meeting also included a proposal for training within the UARJ of a cooperativist initiative, to attract adherents among workers.

The 1959 and 1963 congresses, in turn, demonstrate a lower degree of organicity. At the 1959 congress, initiatives such as cultural centers (in particular the Centro de Cultura Social and Centro de Estudos Professor José Oiticica), theater groups, the Nossa Chácara space and the publication of the anarchist press and libertarian books were discussed. This conference also drew attention to initiatives related to community organizations, giving greater weight to cultural initiatives. As early as 1963, militants discussed the situation of O Libertarian, the only anarchist newspaper in circulation at that time, proposing efforts for greater dissemination of it, and also the creation of an agricultural community, along the lines of the kibbutz, using the Nossa Chácara space. A strategy set in motion by the previous meeting and which had been resumed was the creation of cultural centers throughout the country, reaffirming the focus on cultural initiatives, indicating that anarchists considered that union action at that time had not produced the expected fruits, and that the mobilization of energy in the opening and consolidation of a new social vector was the most appropriate to do.

=== Union, cultural and solidarity practices ===
The 1948 Anarchist Congress stressed the need for libertarian activists to join unions in their respective professions, seeking to intervene in their organic lives and forming union defense or resistance groups, based on the principles of revolutionary syndicalism. In the anarchist press, harsh criticisms of the corporatist structure and what they called "hideous unionism" were common, while there was an incentive to grassroots union struggles, believing that, through them, a new awakening of revolutionary syndicalism would be possible. There was a concern to spread anarchist ideas to the workers, especially through the press. The newspaper Ação Direta was distributed in Rio de Janeiro in places where there was a large influx of workers, on newsstands in front of factories, trams or stocking points. Amid the striking effervescence in the democratization process, anarchists, still in 1946, tried to form union opposition groups, such as the Proletarian Union of São Paulo, of ephemeral life. More concrete investments were made in 1951, with the constitution of the Light Workers Union Guidance Group in Rio de Janeiro, which edited a specific newspaper for union issues in the category, called UNIR, and in 1953, with the constitution of the Union Orientation Movement (MOS) in São Paulo, which counted on the participation of anarchists, independent socialists, syndicalists and “activists from various professional sectors”, especially in the sector of graphic workers.

In 1958, MOS published the newspaper Ação Sindical, and in the same year unsuccessfully launched an opposition within the graphics union, defending political neutrality, union autonomy and direct action methods. In a more isolated way, the militant from Rio de Janeiro Serafim Porto was very active among professors in Rio de Janeiro and Edgard Leuenroth was part of several congresses and organizing initiatives of São Paulo journalists, including appointed president of the Press History Commission in 1957, the year in which he also participated in the VII Congress of Journalists, by the São Paulo delegation. Finding difficulties for a greater insertion in the unions for in addition to the modest initiatives attempted, anarchists began to dedicate themselves, especially in the 1960s, to cultural actions. During this time, the philosopher Mário Ferreira dos Santos translated and published a work in which the German anarchist Rudolf Rocker talked about the origins of libertarian socialism. At the same time, Mário launched the book Dialectical Analysis of Marxism, where he made a libertarian critique of Marxism.

In 1947, the anarchists of São Paulo reactivated the CCS and began to promote a series of conferences, lectures, debates, theater groups and soirees. In Rio de Janeiro, anarchists had a space for the realization of cultural activities in 1958, with the foundation of the Professor José Oiticica Study Center (CEPJO). At the national level, there was an effort for the maintenance of the anarchist press, with the edition of the periodical O Libertário between 1960 and 1964. There were also editorial initiatives aimed at the dissemination of anarchist literature, such as Editora Germinal, in Rio de Janeiro, maintained by the Portuguese Roberto das Neves, and Edições Sagitário, maintained by anarchists from São Paulo. The focus on cultural initiatives took place in a context of minimal maintenance of anarchism, where such activities served as a means to maintain a link between the new and old generations of activists and supporters. With the completion of the 1964 coup, anarchists soon came together to take stock of the political situation. The CEPJO was in operation for another four years until its definitive closure, by aeronautical agents in 1968, and the CCS was closed after the promulgation of Institutional Act Number Five, interrupting its activities on the 21st April 1969, forcing it to become clandestine.

In addition to practices in the union and cultural field, between 1945 and 1964 anarchists actively supported the political exiles from Spain and Portugal, countries that were then under the dictatorships of Francisco Franco and Antônio de Oliveira Salazar, respectively. Among the exiles, the Portuguese Edgar Rodrigues and Spanish Manuel Pérez Fernández were very active in the Brazilian anarchist movement and also in the fight against Francoism and Salazarism in national territory. While Edgar Rodrigues soon became involved with the journal Ação Direta, Manuel Pérez Fenández housed several exiled Iberian anarchists in his home, so that his residence came to be known as "the Consulate of Anarchists". The articulation of Brazilian anarchist militants with militants from abroad drew the attention of police officers, who fearful of actions that could be considered subversive, started to investigate anarchist activity, especially in São Paulo during the year of 1948, pointing out a series of links between the CCS and the Hispanic-American Salon.

Among some of the most prominent actions were the campaign initiated by the CEPJO to save the Spanish anarchist José Comin Pardillos, who was smuggled to Brazil on a ship called Cabo San Roque, on May 17, 1959, and which had the support of National Union of Students (UNE). Even with the mobilization, Pardillos was given over to the Maritime Police and returned to Spanish territory. More successful was the solidarity action with the militants of the Iberian Revolutionary Directory of Liberation (DRIL) on board the Portuguese ship Santa Maria. In the early hours of January 23, 1961, DRIL militants organized an action to take control of this ship, which resulted in the death of one crew member and two wounded. The action aimed to carry out a political act of opposition to the Iberian dictatorships and was organized in the city of Caracas, in Venezuela. Pursued by joint action by the Navy and the Air Forces of several countries, they ended up surrendering to the authorities of the Brazilian government on February 2, a few days after the inauguration of Jânio Quadros. The issue was widely reported in the media and according to Edgar Rodrigues' testimony some DRIL members stayed at Nossa Chácara for a few months, while others stayed for a longer time.

== Military dictatorship (1964–1985) ==
Right after the 1964 coup, the anarchists of Rio de Janeiro tried to get rid of the compromising material that were in the CEPJO meeting minutes and physical space. Materials had to be shredded and thrown into the trash of the building that housed the anarchist cultural center. The minutes of the meetings were redone with subjects that could be read by police authorities and a meeting was scheduled with the anarchists of São Paulo for May 1, 1964. The theme of the meeting was the political situation in Brazil, a balance of known prisons and the keeping of documents related to anarchist activities in Rio de Janeiro and São Paulo. The edition of The Libertarian for the month of April was suspended and in its place, the anarchists founded the periodical Dealbar in 1965, marked by a more discreet tone and centered on cultural issues. Dealbar had 17 numbers, circulating between 1965 and 1968. Other anarchist journals, of a militant nature, circulated during this period, however, all of them were short-lived, such as O Protesto, linked to a group of libertarian students from Porto Alegre and that circulated between 1967 and 1968; Self-management, also from 1968, distributed to student unions in the interior of Rio de Janeiro; and Operational Self-Management, 1969.

The anarchist performance, at least until 1968, was marked by the discretion of the activities of the cultural centers and their modest press, which served as a point of contact so that the militants could continue to articulate, even if minimally. Meetings of anarchists were often organized in the militants' own homes, to discuss issues regarding the survival of anarchism in the period and the political situation in Brazil. Cultural activities had a public character, while strictly political activities were carried out quietly among militants.

=== Libertarian Student Movement (MEL) ===
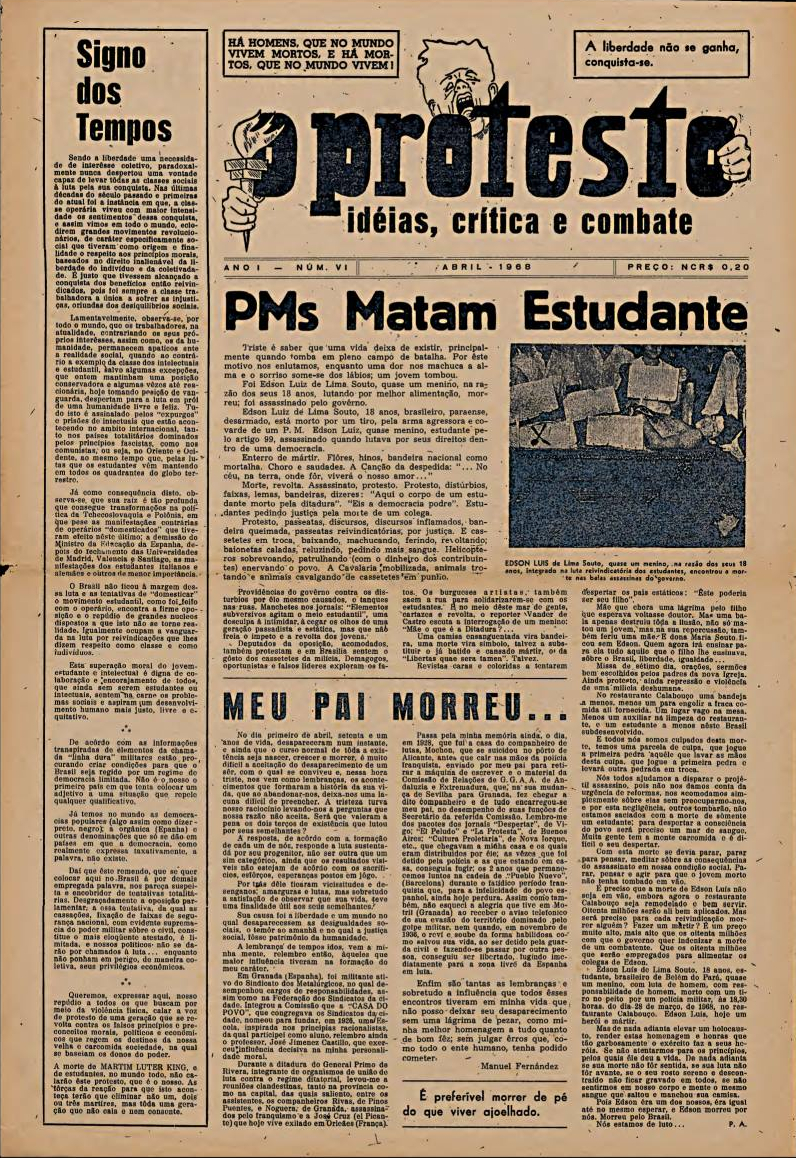
The newspaper O Protesto, from Porto Alegre, circulated between 1967 and 1968, bringing guidelines from the student movement and criticism of the military regime

Most of the leftist militant and support base during the 1960s was made up of young students. Recognizing this fact, Ideal Peres stated that "any movement there can only progress and take shape if it is initiated and guided by young students. I sincerely believe that the old companions are no longer in physical and cultural conditions for a reactivation of movement". In addition, although the dictatorship repressed some of the main leaders and affected the functioning of their entities, the student movement had relative freedom of action between 1965 and 1968, becoming an active space of opposition to the military regime. In this context, the gaucho anarchists who edited O Protesto established contacts between new militants from Rio de Janeiro and São Paulo, founding the Libertarian Student Movement (MEL) in 1967 and inserted themselves into the student struggles of the period.

In February 1968, MEL activists held the 1st National Meeting of Libertarian Students, whose resolutions were published in the fifth issue of O Protesto, defending the founding of a coordinating committee for libertarian students in order to create a local and then national organization; active participation in students' demonstrations; solidarity with students and the social movement more broadly, preaching the alliance of student and worker struggles; greater participation of the bases in the decisions of the student entities and, finally; support to UNE, as long as it was independent of political and demagogic interests. Minimally articulated, MEL activists began to act in the student movement, organizing debates, conferences and meetings, in addition to engaging in the fight against the agreement signed by the Ministry of Education with the United Agency for International Development, seen as a reaction to the demands for university reform raised by students in the 1960s. With the death of Edson Luís de Lima Souto and the later demonstrations, anarchists denounced the repression and affirmed that "it is necessary that Edson Luís's death is not in vain", also launching, at the same time, a pamphlet entitled Eye for an eye: Tooth for a tooth, which drew attention of repressive agents.

=== Suppression of MEL and CEPJO ===
With the AI-5 decree in 1968 and the repressive escalation, the CEPJO's headquarters was invaded by Air Force agents and 18 militants were arrested in October 1969. Among them, there were MEL militants and Ideal Peres, who remained in prison for a month. The anarchists of Porto Alegre behind O Protesto also underwent military investigations in the same period. The arrested militants were denounced under the National Security Law for "redistributing material or propaganda funds from foreign sources to infiltrate doctrines or ideas incompatible with the constitution" and "forming, joining or maintaining an association that, under the guidance of a foreign government or international organization, carries out activities that are harmful or dangerous to national security". In this process, a MEL activist was accused of working in the journal O Protesto and having distributed the newspaper Autogestão to student unions in the countryside of Rio de Janeiro; another militant was accused of sending newspapers to Bolivia and of participating in meetings in which issues related to the periodical and about anarchist themes were discussed; two militants from Rio Grande do Sul were also indicted and had their homes invaded by agents of repression, who reported having found "abundant subversive material" in their homes. In this process, all 16 militants were acquitted, thanks to legal maneuvers and because of the legal facade of cultural centers managed by anarchists.

In January 1971, the police chief and the head of the DOPS registry office issued a warrant to search and seize books, newspapers and writings deemed to be subversive, an action that resulted, on February 15, 1971, in the seizure of 1,450 books by Daniel Guérin at Editora Prôa, among other materials. The agents were also looking for information about a supposed "anarchist organization" and called attention to a possible link of militants from Rio Grande do Sul with Uruguayan anarchists, due to a manifesto by Tupamaros reproduced in the pages of the journal Self-management.

After the repression of the MEL and CEPJO, anarchists, between 1972 and 1977, concentrated on receiving and guiding those who approached them, carrying out advertising for Editora Germinal and dedicating themselves to the study and rescue of the history of anarchism. Most of the meetings started to be held in the apartment of Ideal Peres and Esther Redes, in Rio de Janeiro, and in the Nossa Chácara space, in São Paulo. Even with the limitation of activities, communication with anarchists from abroad was constant, so that newspapers from international anarchism were kept and later disseminated among the militants.

=== Press, student movement, union and counterculture ===
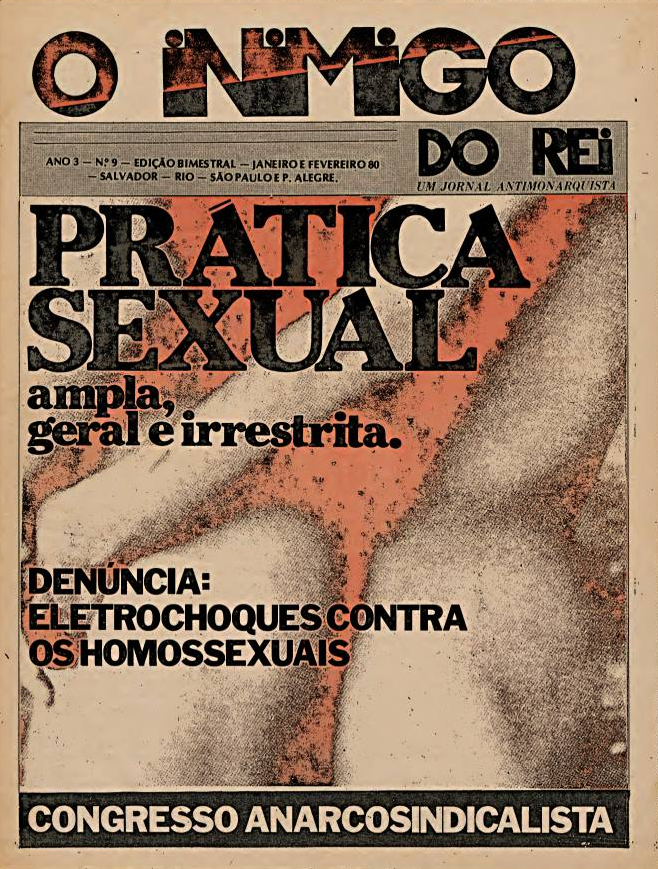
O Inimigo do Rei circulated between 1977 and 1988 and was instrumental in the reorganization of anarchism in Brazil during the period of political opening. In addition to themes related to anarchism, it addressed issues related to the countercultural sphere, drugs and sexuality

In 1977, there was a resumption of the anarchist press with the newspaper O Inimigo do Rei, launched by Bahian students who joined anarchism in the wave of student demonstrations and the counterculture of that period, being published, with some gaps, until 1988. The newspaper arose from the clash between these students of Federal University of Bahia with other political currents of the left, being born without a direct relationship with the "old guard" of anarchism. Soon, O Inimigo do Rei started to have collaborators from Rio de Janeiro, São Paulo and Porto Alegre, becoming an important vehicle for the rearticulation of Brazilian anarchism during the political opening, proposing the constitution of a Libertarian Student Federation (FLE) and, later, the formation of the pro-COB nuclei, defending the union as "the worker organization par excellence". Raising criticism of the process of redemocratization, especially with regard to the lack of popular participation, O Inimigo do Rei also brought agendas from the black movement, homosexuals and feminists.

In the workers' movement, especially in São Paulo, the anarchists worked in the Libertarian Collective of Union Opposition (COLOPS), taking advantage of the 1st National Meeting of Workers in Opposition to the Union Structure (ENTOES) to organize themselves better, approaching the ideas defended by Metallurgical Operational Opposition (OPOM), and also rehearsed some initiatives in the banking and education sector.

From the 1970s onwards, the influence of anarchist ideas on counterculture was perceived, through periodicals such as Tribo of 1972, and Soma, which circulated between 1973 and 1974, investing in visual experimentalism, seeking of new languages, dialogue with manifestations of the cultural industry and the cult of psychedelic aesthetics, with some specific references to anarchism. Even O Inimigo do Rei, despite its militant character, dialogued with counterculture themes, bringing a bolder language, quite ironic and humorous, and in addition to the texts on political and social issues, it published articles on topics such as drugs and sexuality. Also the magazine Barbárie, which circulated between 1979 and 1982, featured a language and a range of themes very similar to those of O Inimigo do Rei, reflecting the influence of the counterculture.

== Redemocratization (1985 onwards) ==
Political openness has given rise to a series of new and reformulated discussions in the anarchist milieu on neoliberalism, trade unionism and identity issues, such as gender, sexuality and ethnic-racial issues. With the end of the military dictatorship, the anarchists of Rio de Janeiro, with Ideal Peres at the head, founded the Circle of Libertarian Studies (CEL), in 1985. Within this space, several collectives and anarchist groups developed even in the 1980s and early 1990s. In the same period, the CCS in São Paulo was reactivated, which had been in hiding since 1968, with the participation of Antônio Martinez and Jaime Cubero. In the union, a rearticulation of the old COB was attempted, an initiative carried out by the militants organized in these spaces and the periodical O Inimigo do Rei, with an anarcho-syndicalist proposal.

In the cultural milieu, anarchism was widely accepted among the punk movement, which, through musical and behavioral style, brought libertarian discourses and practices, establishing a cultural activism in solidarity with other social causes. Militants from the punk movement and anarchopunk played an important role in the attempts to rebuild the COB and in the subsequent articulation of anarchism in specific organizations, as early as the second half of the 1990s. Also noteworthy is the creation of new journals, such as Utopia, which circulated between 1988 and 1992, and the foundation of the publisher Novos Tempos/Imaginário, through the initiative of Plínio Augusto Coelho, who was returning from France and translated several anarchist works, still unpublished, by Pierre-Joseph Proudhon, Mikhail Bakunin and Errico Malatesta, among others.

In the 1990s, anarchism tried to expand and enter more systematically into social movements. In this sense, the Mutirão group, which edited a journal of the same name, defended the articulation of anarchism with the movements of union and land struggle, where it had a certain insertion. In 1991, militants linked to CEL created the bulletin Libera... Amore Mio!, to publicize the group's activities, which were disjointed after the removal of Ideal Peres and his wife Esther Redes, in addition to publish texts propagating anarchist ideology. In the same period, libertarian students from Rio de Janeiro organized the 9 de Julho Student Anarchist Collective (CAE-9), which soon surpassed the student front and came to be called the Grupo Anarquista Ação Direta (GAAD), organizing itself in work fronts and with a proposal for insertion by location and work. In August 1992, in an attempt at national rearticulation, a meeting was held in São Paulo titled "Another 500 - International Libertarian Thought". The event's motto was criticism of the Earth Summit and the celebrations of the 500th anniversary of the arrival of Europeans in America. The meeting was attended by prominent libertarian intellectuals, such as Cornelius Castoriadis, Ronald Craig, Pietro Ferrua, Eduardo Colombo, Maurício Tragtenberg and Roberto Freire. In this event, it was decided to create an Information Network, whose objective would be the dissemination of news and activities of interest to anarchist groups and individuals. The initiative had an ephemeral character, but it served to establish ties between activists from different regions. The bulletin Libera... was one of the main animators of the project and managed to articulate contacts between the militants of the Brazilian anarchist movement even after the end of the Information Network, reaching a circulation of 2,000 copies and circulating nationally.

In the second half of the 1990s, the first contacts between Brazilian anarchists and the Federación Anarquista Uruguaya (FAU) began. In 1994, CEL activists who edited the bulletin Libera ... for the first time entered a dialogue with the especifista conception defended by FAU, which advocated the performance of anarchists in the social sphere (in popular movements) and politics (in a specific organization), seeking the participation of anarchists in social movements, disseminating libertarian ideas and practices. Relations with the FAU deepened in 1995, culminating in the formation of the Anarchist Federation of Rio Grande do Sul (Portuguese: Federação Anarquista Gaúcha, FAG), and in the publication of the document "Fight and Organization: For the Brazilian Anarchist Construction", which aimed to create, in the short term, political instances organized at the local level, and in the long term, to constitute an anarchist organization at the national level. With this, in 1997 the Libertarian Socialist Organization (OSL) was formed, an anarchist level group formed by group state organizations and organizations identified with especifismo, which existed until the year 2000.

In the 2000s, an attempt was made to unite individualist and organizationist tendencies into a synthesis organization. One of the most relevant initiatives was the International Libertarian Culture Meeting, which took place at Federal University of Santa Catarina (UFSC) between September 4 and 7, 2000, in which participants from militants involved in social movements to practitioners of somatherapy participated. At the event, an Anarchist Federation was proposed to bring together these various trends, however, the proposal did not materialize in view of the existing divergences between them. Organizational anarchists linked to specificism then created the Organized Anarchism Forum (FAO) in September 2001, with the aim of forming an anarchist organization at the national level. With the founding of the Anarchist Federation of Rio de Janeiro (FARJ) in 2003, the bulletin Libera... became the official organ of the organization, spreading the specific proposal among the Brazilian militants. The organization of the especifista current culminated in 2012 in the foundation of the Brazilian Anarchist Coordination (CAB), which today aggregates FAG, in Rio Grande do Sul; FARJ, in Rio de Janeiro; Anarchist Black Flag Collective (CABN), in Santa Catarina; Coletivo Anarquista Luta de Classes (CALC), in Paraná; Anarchist Federation of Palmares (FARPA), in Alagoas; Specific Anarchist Forum (FAE) in Bahia; Coletivo Mineiro Popular Anarquista (COMPA) of Minas Gerais; the Anarchist Socialist Libertarian Organization (OASL) in São Paulo; Libertarian Resistance Organization (ORL) in Fortaleza; Anarchist Cabana Federation (FACA) in Pará; and Rusga Libertária in Mato Grosso. In 2003, the União Popular Anarquista (UNIPA) emerged, out of specifism, claiming what it called "Bakuninism", based on the organizational theories of Russian anarchist Mikhail Bakunin.

In relation to social movements, anarchists have played a relevant role, albeit a minority one, in unions, community and neighborhood associations, student mobilizations, homeless and landless movements. In the 1990s, anarchists began to support urban occupations, such as that of oil tankers from the north of Rio de Janeiro in Campo Grande, which resulted in the murder of a trade union activist recognized in the struggle for platform occupations, in addition to the Batistinha occupations, in 1997, and Nova Canudos, in 1998 and 1999, both in Rio de Janeiro and with the direct participation of anarchist militants. From 2000, more occupations with a strong anarchist presence took place in the capital of Rio de Janeiro, such as the Centro Popular Canudos in 2003, Chiquinha Gonzaga in 2004, Zumbi dos Palmares and Vila da Conquista in 2005, Quilombo das Guerreiras in 2006 and Largo do Boticário in 2007.

Several squats were also formed with the participation of anarchists, such as the Occupation Flor do Asfalto, in Rio de Janeiro, Casa da Lagartixa Preta, in Santo André, and Utopia Urban Settlement and Luta, in Porto Alegre. The work with rural occupation movements, especially the Landless Workers' Movement (MST), was also carried out by libertarian militants, with emphasis on the campaign initiated by the FAG denouncing the assassination of Elton Brum da Silva by the Military Police in 2009 during a land eviction, which resulted in a raid on the organization's headquarters and the indictment of eight of its members. In the instance of syndicalism, UNIPA anarchists have worked at the Central Sindical e Popular Conlutas, while the militants linked to the especifista organizations act in the Popular Resistance, an organization of a tendency driven by anarchists of those organizations present in Rio Grande do Sul, Rio de Janeiro, São Paulo, Pará, Mato Grosso and Goiás, and works with student, union and community movements, seeking to build libertarian practices in these movements. Libertarian trends driven by anarchists also organized the Latin American Meeting of Popular Autonomous Organizations (ELAOPA). Among the cultural initiatives, in addition to the Social Culture Centers in Rio de Janeiro and São Paulo, other initiatives stand out, such as the Ateneu Libertário Batalha de Várzea, in Porto Alegre, and the Terra Livre Library, in São Paulo; the Anarchist Book Fairs, which have been held in several cities in the country since 2006; and the articulation of community pre-university entrance courses.

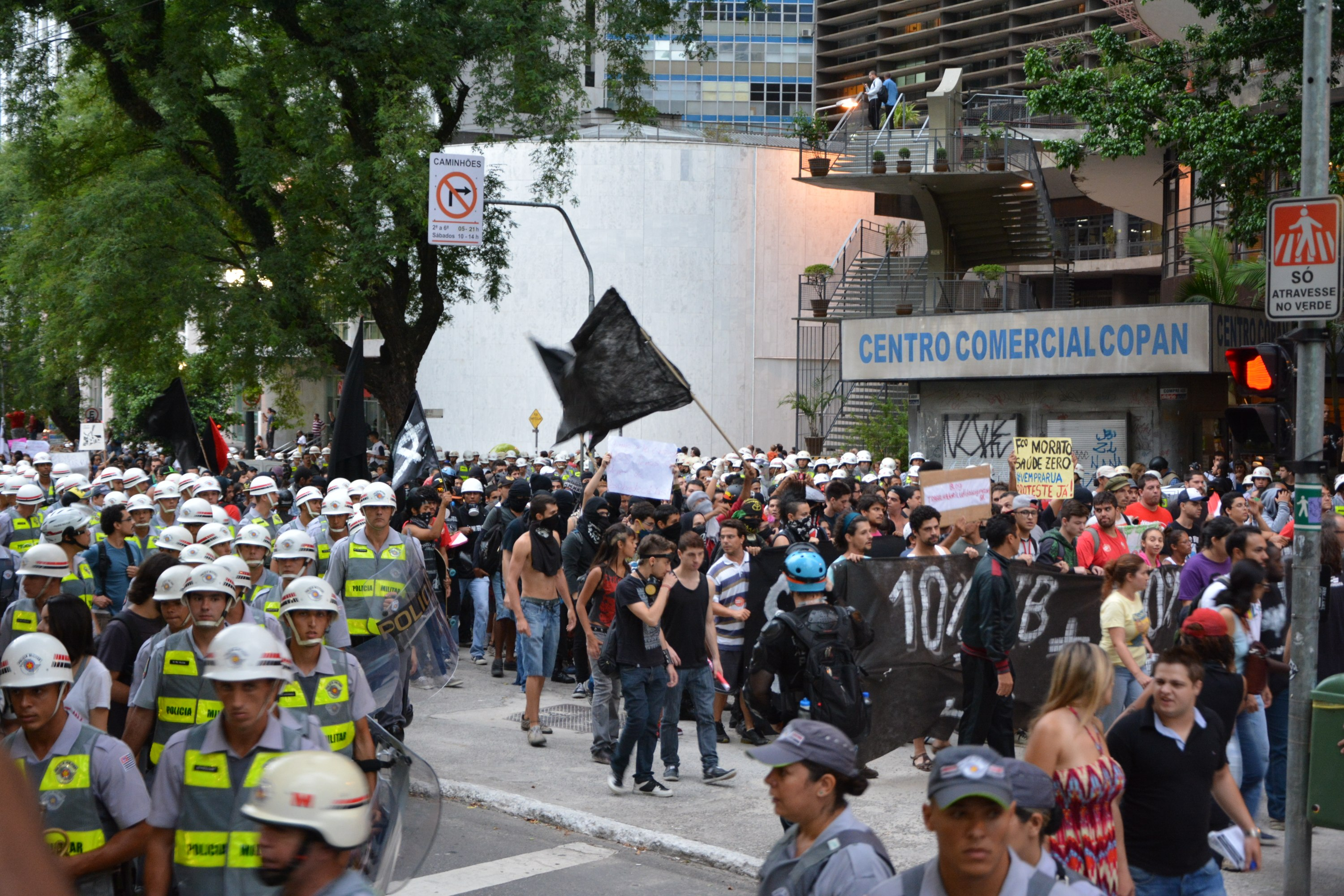
Anarchist protest in São Paulo, protesting the World Cup

Anarchists have also played an important role in protest movements. The first movement of this type in which Brazilian anarchists played a prominent role after redemocratization was the Peoples' Global Action, in the wake of the anti-globalization struggles, during the late 1990s and especially in the early 2000s. Motivated by this context, Brazilian anarchists began to dedicate their militant efforts to creating and disseminating media based on a logic of horizontal internal organization, which could serve as a tool for existing mobilizations and movements. Following this logic, they created a Brazilian nucleus of the Independent Media Center (IMC), which from the campaigns against the establishment of the Free Trade Area of the Americas (FTAA) has come to play a prominent role in mobilizations against globalization in Brazil.

In 2006, the WCC entered a new cycle, in which the network's volunteers began to dedicate themselves to local popular movements such as the struggle for housing, indigenous movements, autonomous collectives and the construction of the Movimento Passe Livre (MPL). Anarchists were involved in the origins of the movement for free public transport, started after protests against the increase in bus tickets in Salvador, in 2003, and in Florianópolis, in 2004, and that culminated, in 2005, in the founding of the MPL in a plenary session of the World Social Forum in Porto Alegre. The struggle for free public transport culminated, in 2013, in a series of demonstrations and popular protests in the main capitals of the country.

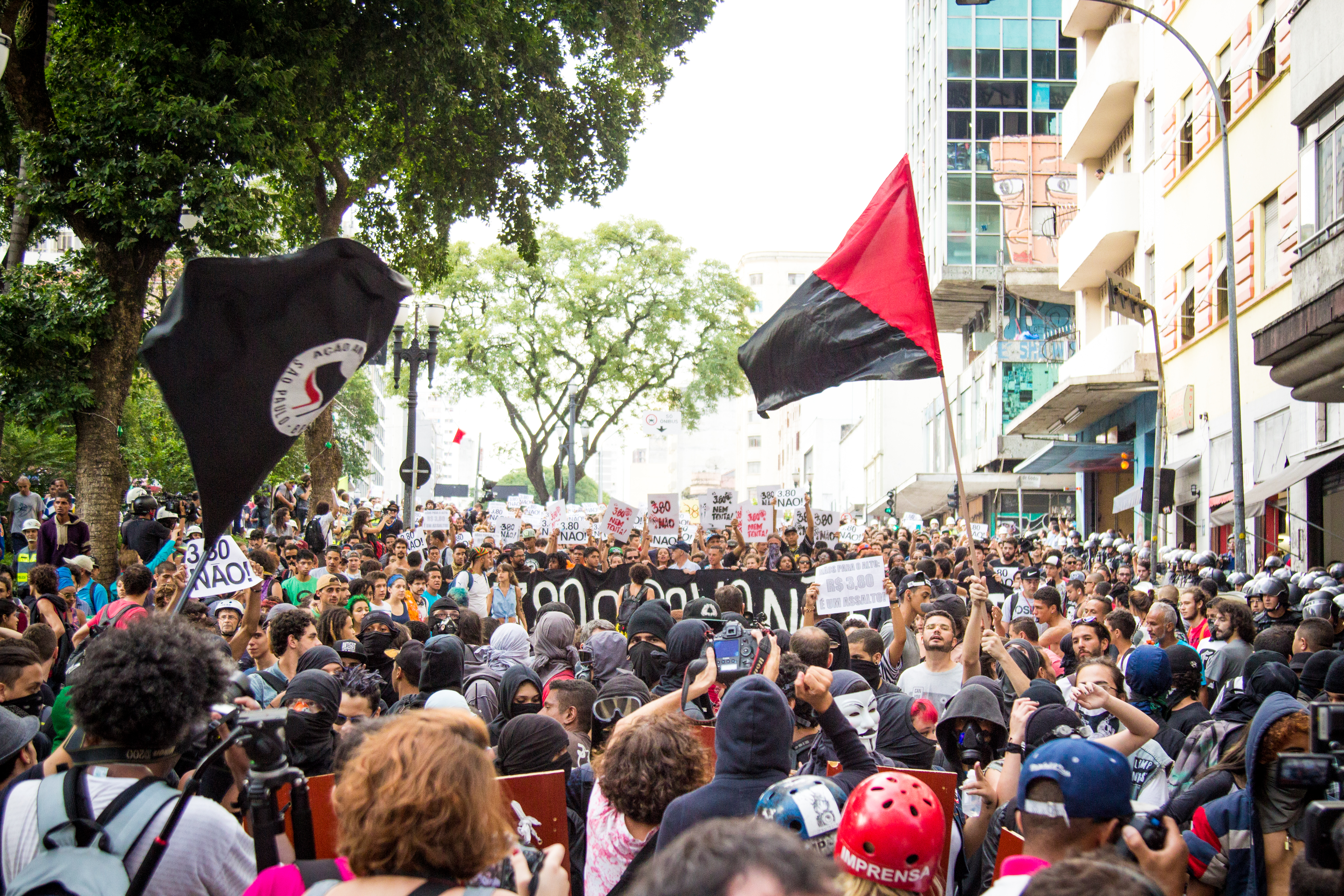
Anarchists protest organizing in São Paulo

During the 2013 protests in Brazil, many protesters identified in some way with anarchism. The protests started with a demonstration articulated on June 6 by MPL and student organizations against the increase of twenty cents in bus, subway and train fares in the city of São Paulo. The organization of these demonstrations took place without a hierarchical system of leaders and base, but of horizontal collectives, critical of the traditional form of politics organized in centralizing parties and unions. According to sociologist Maria da Glória Gohn, "it cannot be said that June 2013 had completely anarchic manifestations", but that "several of the nuclei or collectives that organized the demonstrations" through social networks "were more inspired by the ideals of autonomists, anarchists, libertarians, utopian socialists, etc. than those of the traditional left". Both anarchists linked to specificist organizations and those who did not participate in any anarchist political organization played an active role in these protests.

The use of black bloc tactics gained notoriety during the demonstrations, carried out by anarchists organized in affinity groups. In the wake of the demonstrations against the fare increase in 2013, more radicalized leftist groups, including anarchists, also played a role in the occupations of Porto Alegre and Belo Horizonte City Councils and the demonstrations against the 2014 World Cup. Also seen as a legatee of the 2013 demonstrations, the 2016 student protests in Brazil presented, according to Pablo Ortellado, elements that can be considered libertarian, although not necessarily anarchist, such as, for example, the criticism of the representative system and direct action without the intermediation of parties, concretized in the practice of the occupations. Although a portion of the students mobilized in the occupations were under influence of the UNE and PCdoB, another portion was under significant influence by more autonomist groups. With the rise of Jair Bolsonaro to power, anarcho-communist and anarcho-syndicalist organizations have been active in organizing unions and organizing anti fascist events against the far right in Brazil, going on to participate in the 2021 Brazilian protests.

== See also ==
- Category:Brazilian anarchists
- Federation of Revolutionary Syndicalist Organizations of Brazil
- List of anarchist movements by country
- Landless Workers' Movement
- Communism in Brazil
- Socialism in Brazil
