= Jaime Cubero =

- Born: April 5, 1925; Jundiaí, Brazil
- Died: May 20, 1998 (aged 73); São Paulo, Brazil
- Movement: Anarchism, Education

Jaime Cubero (April 5, 1926 in Jundiaí – May 20, 1998 in São Paulo) was a Brazilian intellectual, journalist, educator and activist linked to the anarchist movement. While still in his teens he founded, with the help of friends, the Youth Center for Social Studies (Portuguese: Centro Juvenil de Estudos Sociais). He participated in numerous activities (lectures, courses, debates, theater plays) in cultural centers in Rio de Janeiro and São Paulo. As an active anarchist militant, he maintained critical of the Estado Novo of Getúlio Vargas and the military dictatorship in Brazil.

He worked for the newspaper O Globo, between 1954 and 1964, when he was forced to leave by the military dictatorship. He actively participated in academic and student circles, advising on the history of Brazilian social movements and libertarian pedagogy. He participated in anarchist congresses in Brazil and abroad. In recent years, he worked as editor of the magazine Libertárias. He died at the age of 71, a victim of health problems.
