= O Inimigo do Rei =

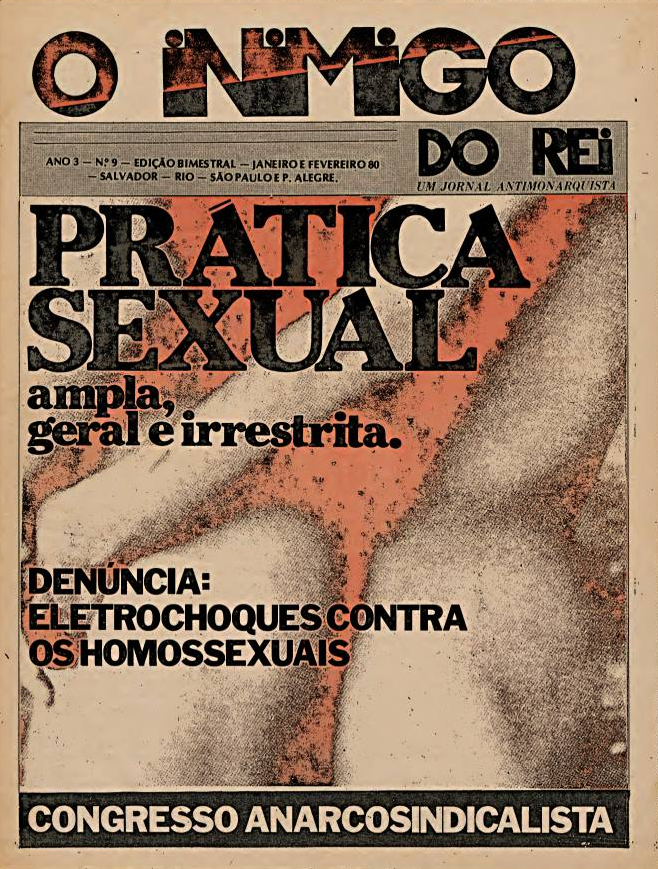
- Publisher: Editora A Livros, Jornais e Revistas
- Founded: 1977
- Ceased publication: 1988
- Political alignment: Anarcho-syndicalism
- Language: Portuguese
- City: Salvador
- Country: Brazil
- OCLC number: 49547940

O Inimigo do Rei was an anarchist newspaper that circulated in Bahia during the military dictatorship in Brazil.

== History ==
Published between 1977 and 1988, O Inimigo do Rei was a part of the alternative press. The newspaper was born in Bahia, like many other newspapers in the 1960s and 1970s. In that period, alternative newspapers popped up across the country, in contrast to the large newspapers, which were often forced to remain silent in the face of strength of the rules imposed by the military dictatorship.

According to Bernardo Kucinski, "in contrast to the complacency of the mainstream press towards the military dictatorship, alternative newspapers vehemently demanded the restoration of democracy and respect for human rights and criticized the economic model. Even in the years of its apparent success, during the “economic miracle”, from 1968 to 1973. Thus, they clashed with the government's triumphalist discourse echoed by the mainstream press, generating a whole alternative discourse."

In several of its editions, workers who collaborated with the newspaper published articles that went against what appeared to be the rigging of unions by the political parties. In the articles they intended to make clear their positions contrary to those who hoped to transform society by participating in the electoral process, making unions increasingly dependent on parties. In the last edition of the newspaper, Nº22, in 1988, the article Breve Histórico da COB was published, in which the history of the Brazilian Workers' Confederation (COB) was explained. The article informed that some groups were organizing for a possible reconstruction of the old confederation, with all its principles and doctrines.

The newspaper O Inimigo do Rei was not dedicated to just anarcho-syndicalism. It was also the spokesperson for several social movements that did not find space in the mainstream press or even in the alternative press, such as drug users, homosexuals, the most radical black and feminist movements, militant atheists, anti-asylum activists, environmentalists and so many others who had their topics covered in the newspaper, which gave it repercussion not only in Brazil but also in the US, Portugal, Spain, Switzerland, Sweden, Italy, Austria, Germany, Argentina, among other countries with which the editors ended up keeping in touch. The concern with the restoration of the Brazilian Workers' Confederation (COB) was only one aspect of the newspaper - it was not the only one.

== Bibliography ==
- Kucinski, Bernardo (2003). Jornalistas e Revolucionários: Nos Tempos da Imprensa Alternativa (in Portuguese) (2nd ed.). São Paulo: University of São Paulo. ISBN 8531407419. OCLC 54022809.
- Oliveira, João Henrique (2011). "Anarquismo, contracultura e imprensa alternativa no Brasil: a história que brota das margens". Cadernos de Pesquisa do CDHIS (in Portuguese). Vol. 24, no. 2. pp. 491–508.
- Silva, Rafael Viana (2017). "Sementes em terreno pedregoso: O anarquismo na ditadura militar brasileira (1964-1985)". In Dellamore, Carolina; Amato, Gabriel; Batista, Natália (eds.). A ditadura aconteceu aqui: A história oral e as memórias do regime militar brasileiro (in Portuguese). São Paulo: Letra e Voz. pp. 211–228. ISBN 9788593467066. OCLC 1019871190.
