= Communism in Brazil =

Foundation of the Communist Party of Brazil

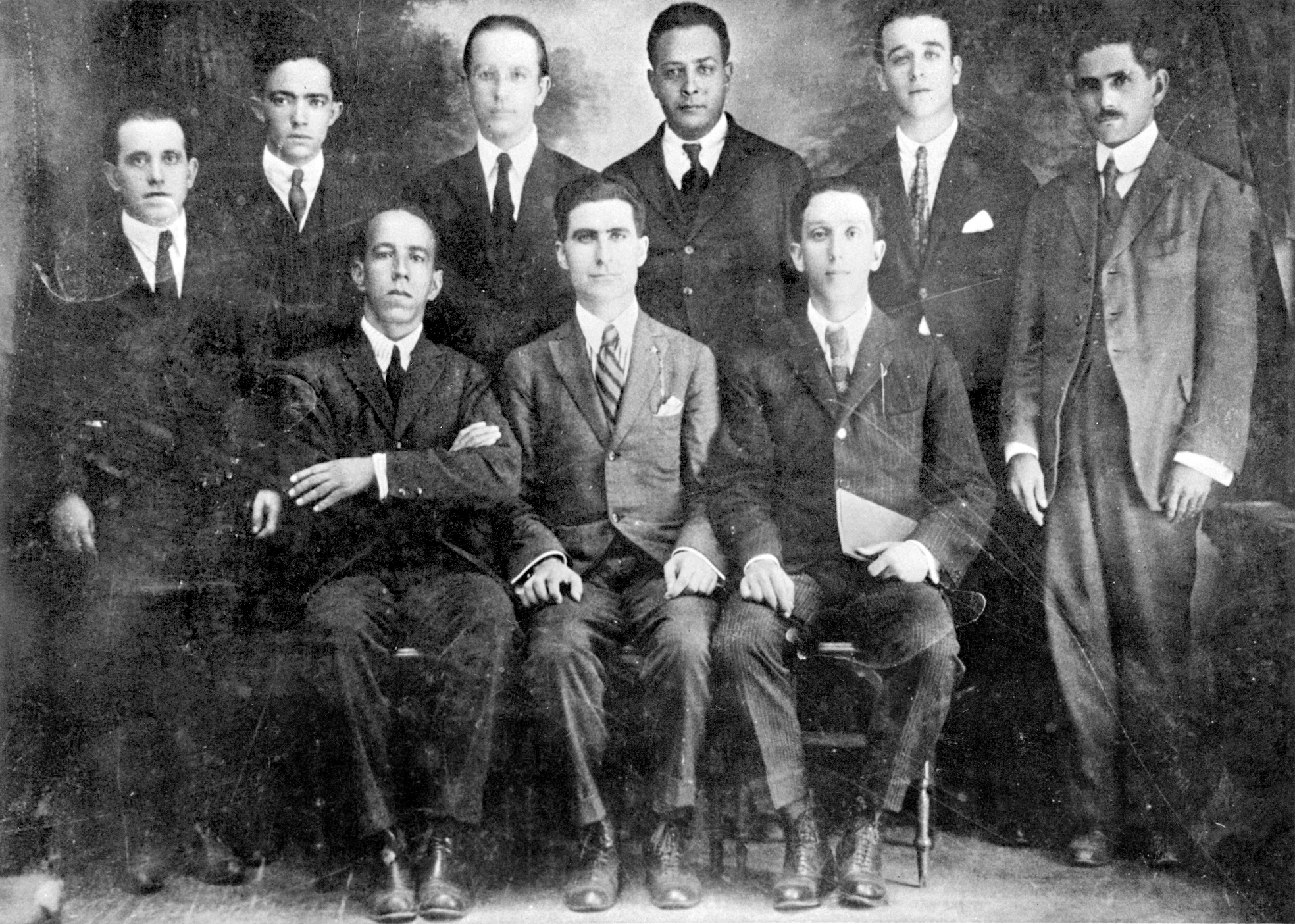
The 9 delegates present at the foundation of the PCB, in March 1922. Standing, from left to right: Manoel Cendón, Joaquim Barbosa, Astrojildo Pereira, João da Costa Pimenta, Luís Perez and José Elias da Silva; sitting, from left to right: Hermogênio da Silva Fernandes, Abílio de Nequete and Cristiano Cordeiro.

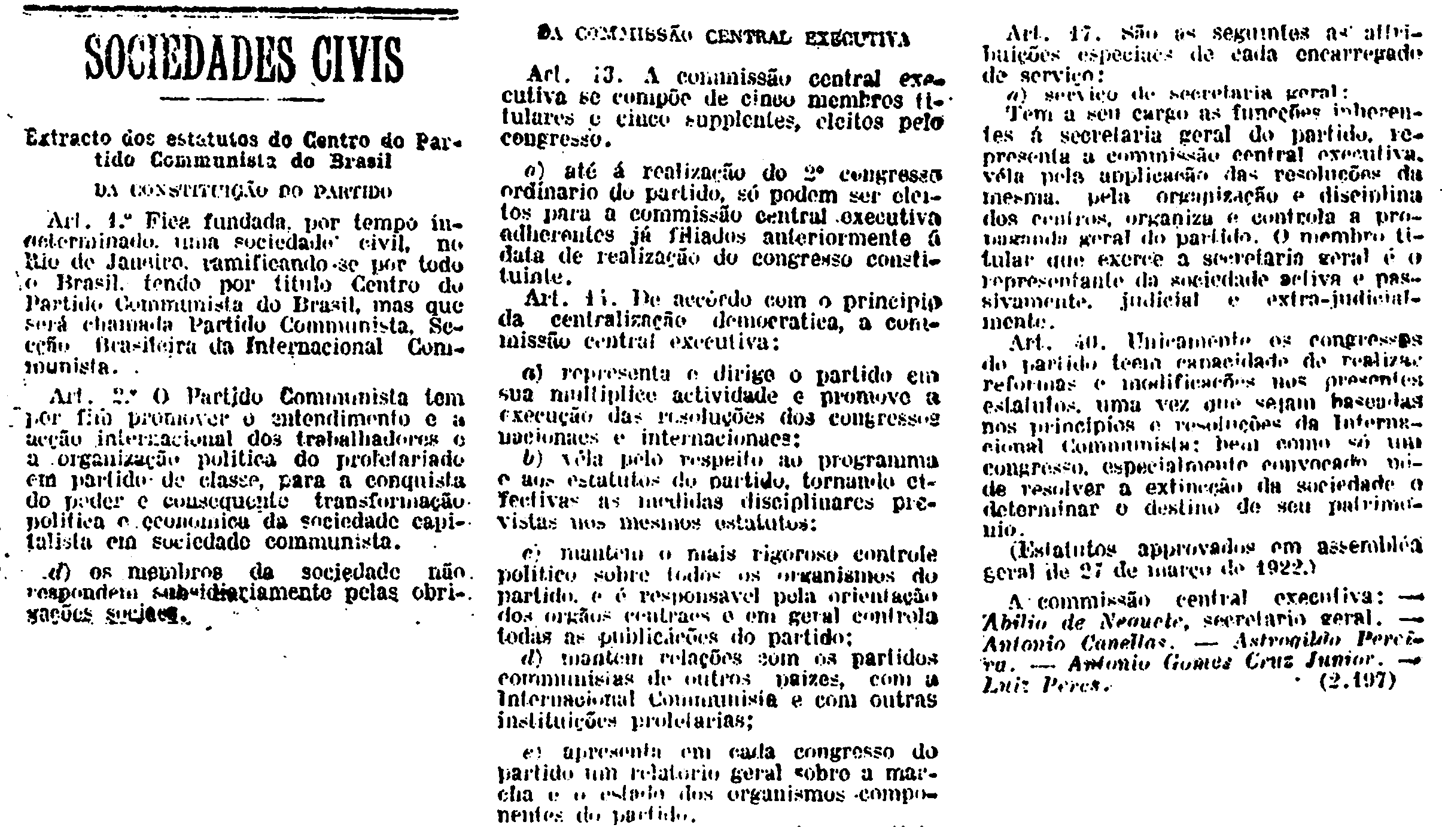
Diário Oficial da União publication instituting the party as a civil society, on 7 April 1922

Communism in Brazil (Portuguese: Communismo) has a history that goes back to the 1920s. The communist movement has been embodied by various leftist factions and uprisings, along with social movements, various political parties, and in the intellectual works of various Marxist authors.

Today, there are seven officially registered political parties in Brazil that claim to be communist or communist-adjacent: the Brazilian Communist Party (PCB), the Communist Party of Brazil (PCdoB), the Workers' Cause Party (PCO), the Socialism and Liberty Party (PSOL), the United Socialist Workers' Party (PSTU), the Workers' Party (PT) and Popular Unity (UP). Additionally, several communist parties in Brazil have their own youth wings: for example, PCB's Young Communist Union (União da Juventude Comunista, UJC); PCdoB's Socialist Youth Union (União da Juventude Socialista, UJS); and PSTU's Rebellion–Socialist Revolution Youth (Rebeldia–Juventude da Revolução Socialista).

There are also multiple communist parties that are not officially registered with Brazil's Superior Electoral Court. Notably, the Revolutionary Communist Party (PCR), with its youth wing, Rebellion Youth Union (União da Juventude Rebelião, UJR).

== History ==
=== Late 19th and early 20th century ===
Workers' organizations in Brazil are have existed since the 19th century. The first known strike by salaried employees occurred in 1858, however the history of slave revolts related to working conditions had been occurring for far longer — slavery was only abolished in Brazil in 1888. Despite limited information, it is known that many slave revolts were ended by police repression.

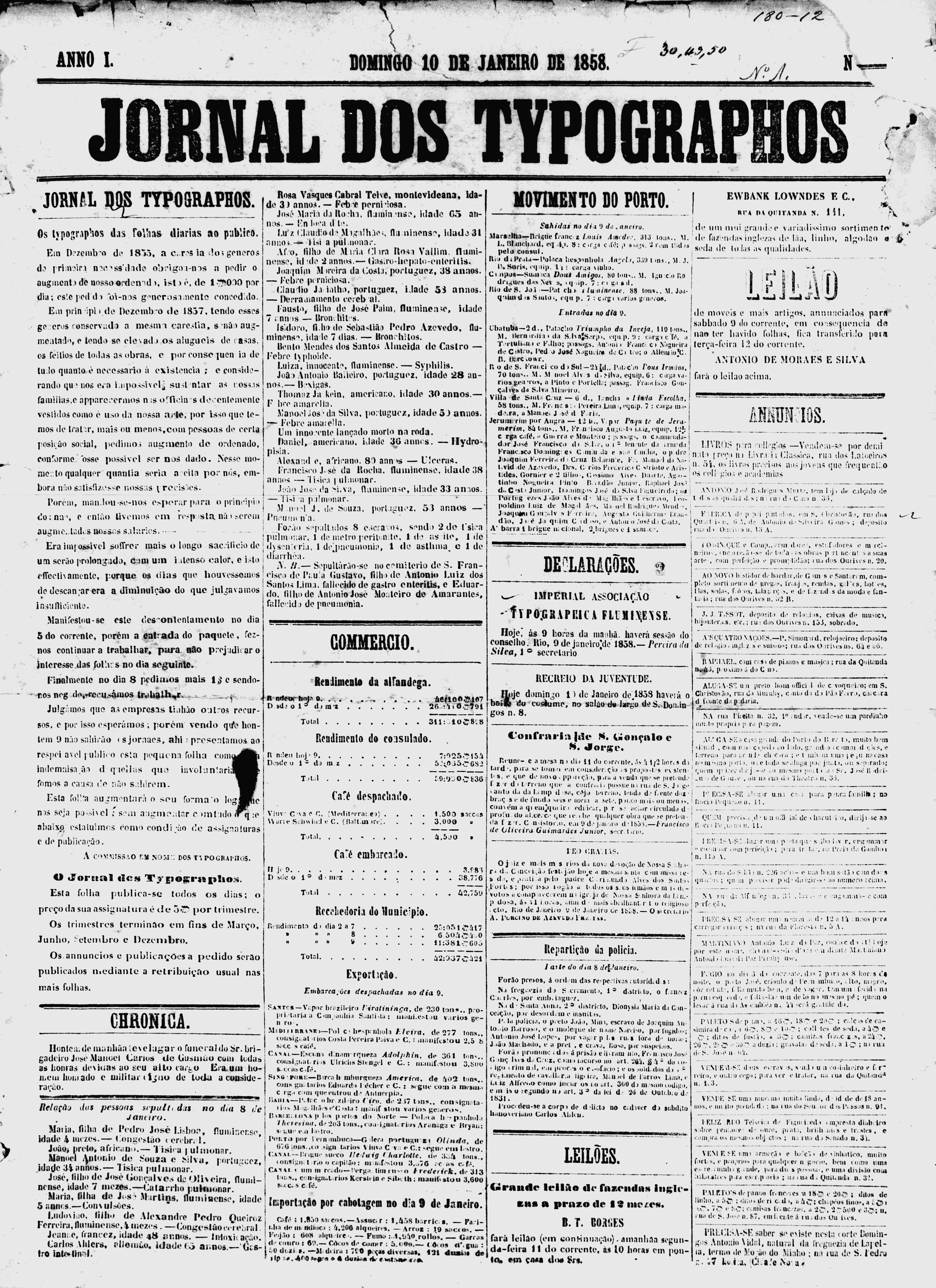
Front page of the first issue of Jornal dos Typographos, from 10 January 1858. The leftmost column contains the typographers' reasoning for the strike and their motivation for starting this new bulletin

On 8 January 1858, 80 typographers from 3 daily publications (Jornal do Commercio, Correio Mercantil and Diário do Rio de Janeiro) went on strike. The workers published a bulletin, titled Jornal dos Typographos, stating their demands for better pay in light of increasing food prices. They further explained that the strike was a last resort after being denied a raise on multiple occasions, as they had not seen an increase in pay since 1855. The result of the typographers' strike is unknown; it lasted until at least 12 March 1858, the date of the last issue of Jornal dos Typographos.

In 1890, the first self-declared socialist political party of Brazil was established in Rio Grande do Sul, namely the Partido Operário do Rio Grande do Sul. It called for, among other things, women's rights and the end of inheritance rights.

Many strikes occurred in the early 1900s, demanding better pay and shorter work days. The 8-hour workday was among the proposals of the First Brazilian Workers' Congress held in April 1906. In October, workers inspired by the proposal participated in a 21-day strike in Porto Alegre, achieving a partial success by reducing their workday from 11 to 9 hours. Strikes were usually met with police repression and, even when successfully leading to new agreements, company owners could simply decide not to honour them or revert any of the changes after some time.

After the abolition of slavery in Brazil in 1888, coffee farmers saw immigration as a source of cheap labor to meet production demands. However, immigrants brought with them ideals of anarchism and socialism, which the landowners considered undesirable. In 1907, federal deputy Adolfo Gordo authored Decree N.1,641, which became known as the Adolfo Gordo Law or the first "Foreigner Expulsion Law", allowing for the immigrants' expulsion from the country for vagrancy or simply "compromising public tranquility". This and other laws authored by Gordo became yet another tool for capitalists to suppress strikes and workers' movements.

Ideologically, not every revolutionary worker self-identified as a communist or a socialist; many were deemed anarchists, who rejected the idea of political parties, and instead preferred direct action or organization through unions. Political theory and literature were not always accessible in Brazil, either because they were not translated into Portuguese, or because the Portuguese text was not accommodating to workers with little to no formal education. As such, many at the time were simply anti-capitalists, supporting a revolution without fully considering what would come after any revolutionary action.

=== World War I and the Russian Revolution ===
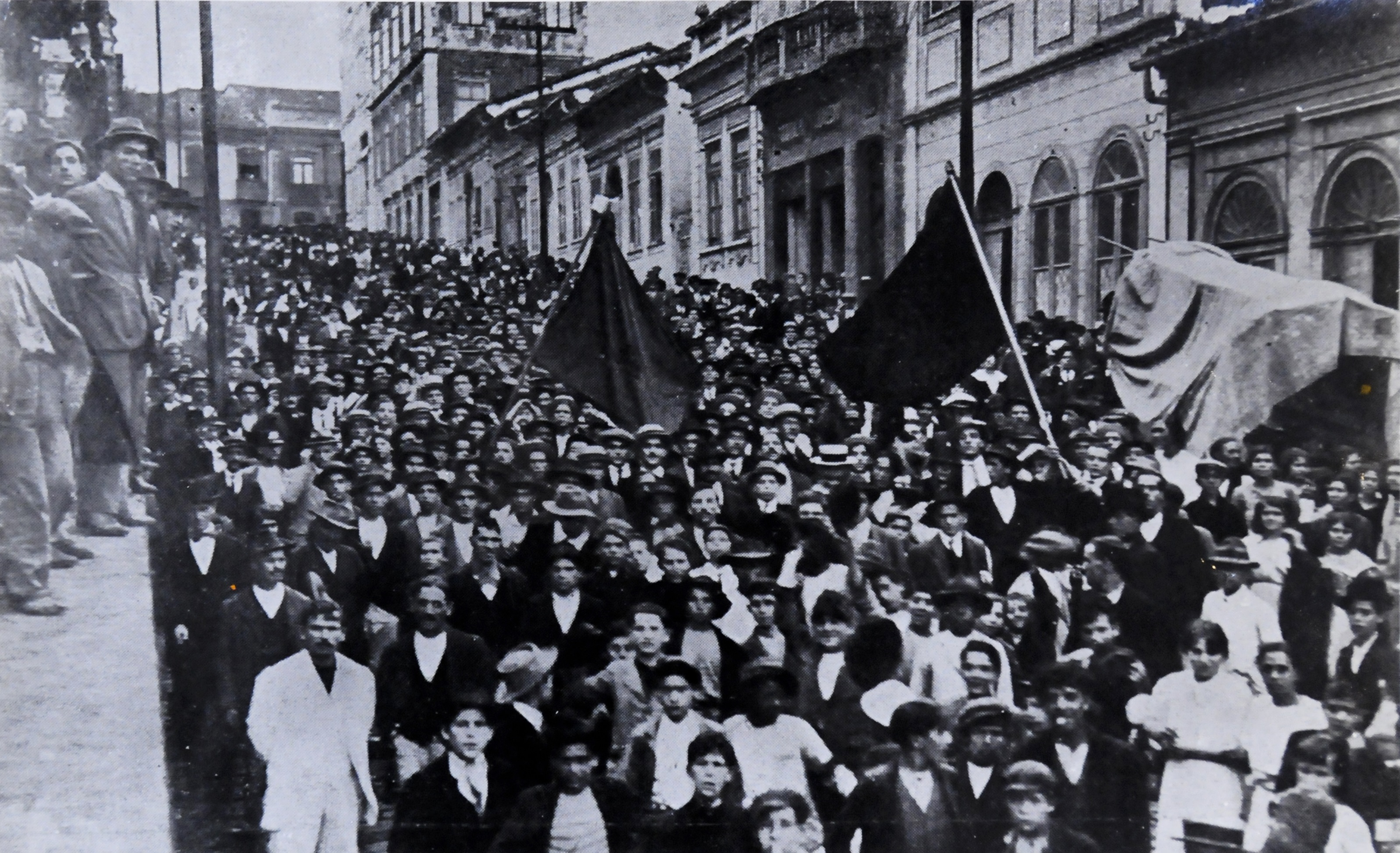
Workers carrying red flags at a demonstration in São Paulo during the 1917 general strike

In July 1914, World War I began. While Brazil did not see direct conflict, the effects of the war were quickly felt by its citizens. Brazil's economy was (as it had been for decades) reliant on exporting coffee; in 1914 the nation controlled around 80% of the world's coffee exports. With the advent of the war, demand for coffee fell drastically. Additionally, Britain's blockade, aimed at preventing aid to the Central Powers from neutral countries such as Brazil, successfully hindered trade with a big part of Europe, worsening Brazil's coffee exports.

In contrast, in certain industries such as textiles, profits skyrocketed. With the war, products that would previously be imported now had to be produced in Brazil, and were even exported in some cases. However, workers did not see those profits; on the contrary, higher demand meant longer workdays of up to 16 hours, without increase in pay. Moreover, with growing demand for food in belligerent countries, Brazil began heavily exporting crops and meat which, in turn, caused shortages and a massive price increase locally. Between 1914 and 1919, prices almost tripled, growing by 185%.

General strike of 1917

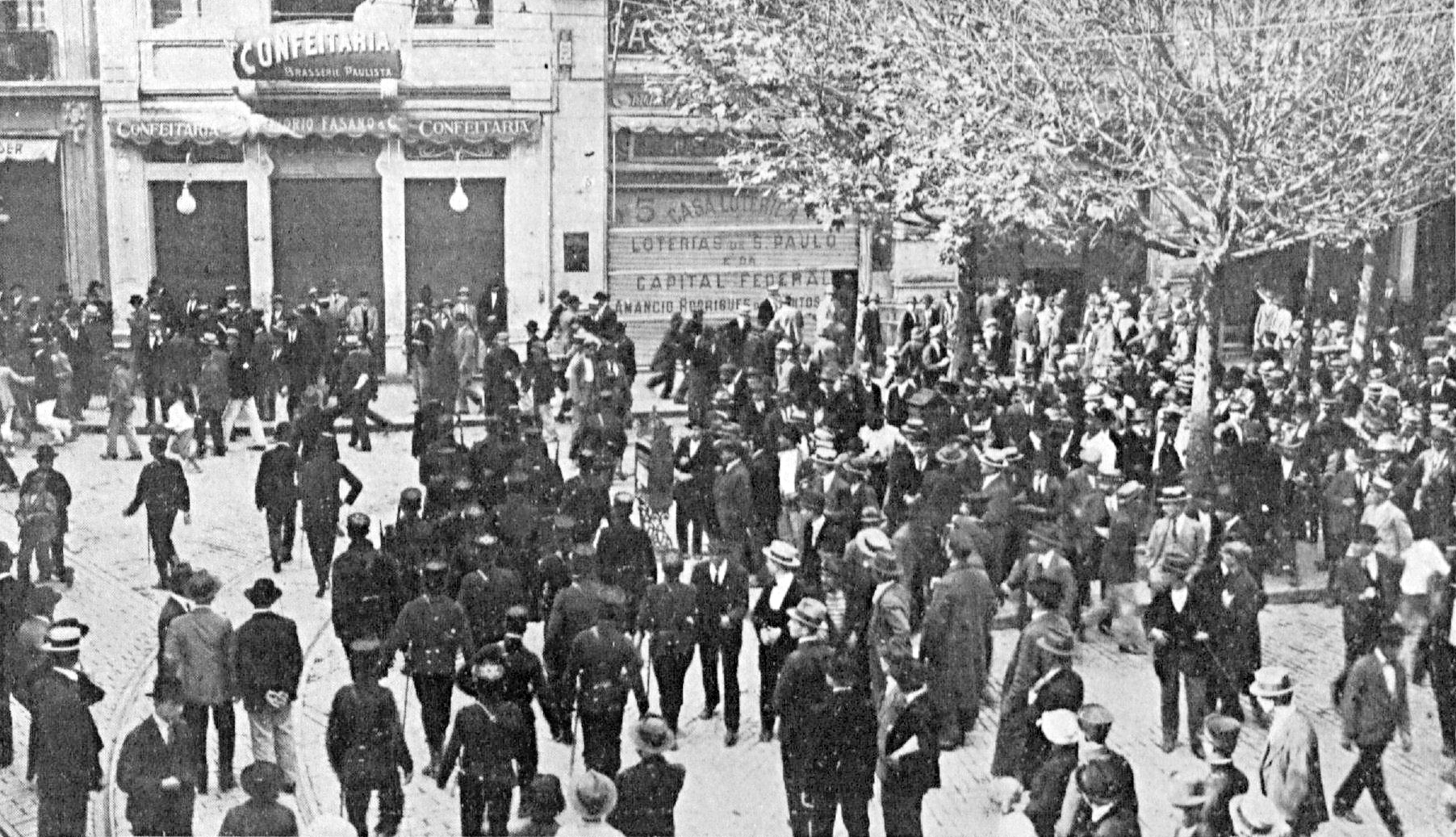
Police dispersing strikers at Antônio Prado Square, in São Paulo

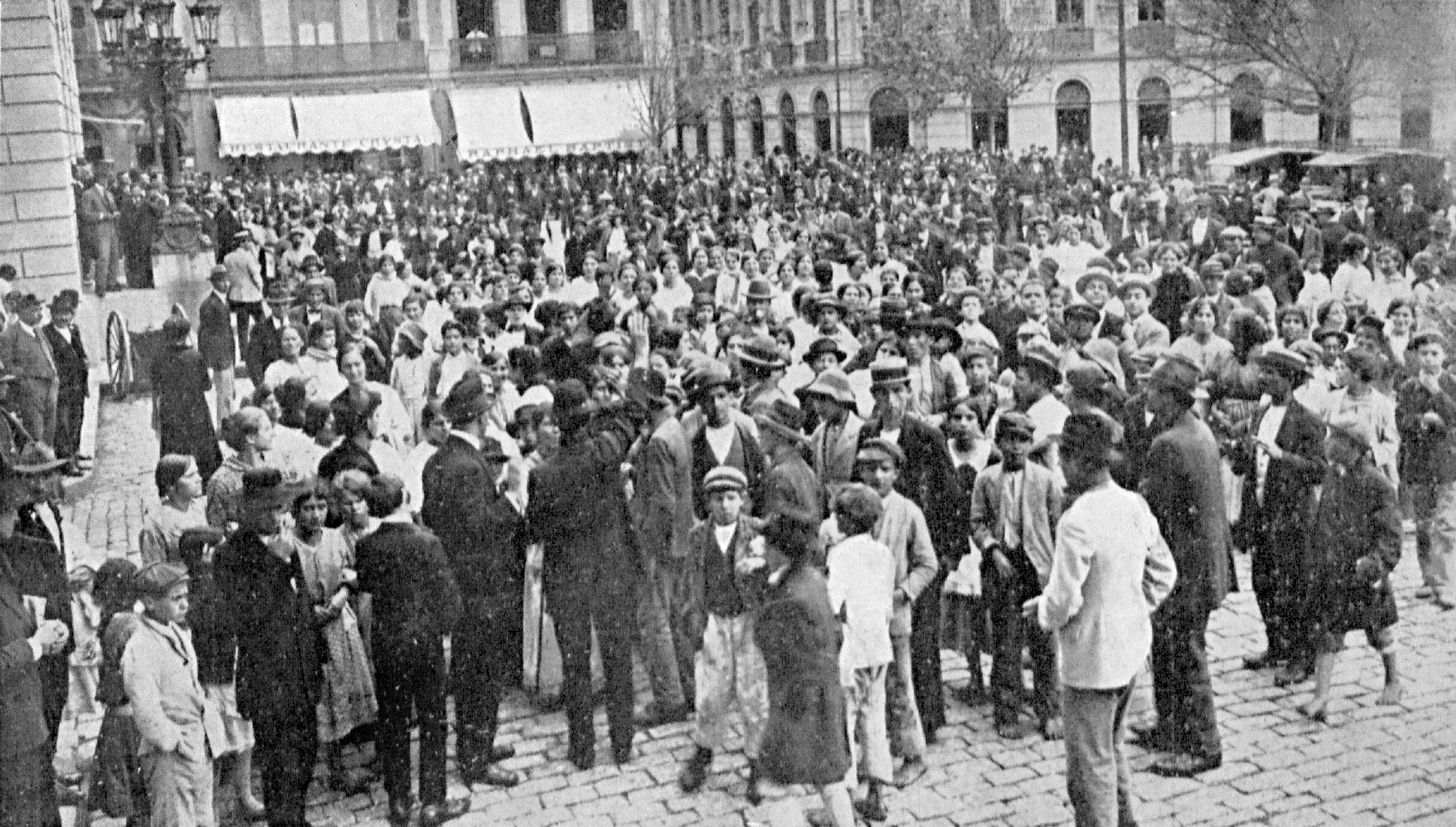
Workers awaiting meeting with Secretary of Justice during the strike

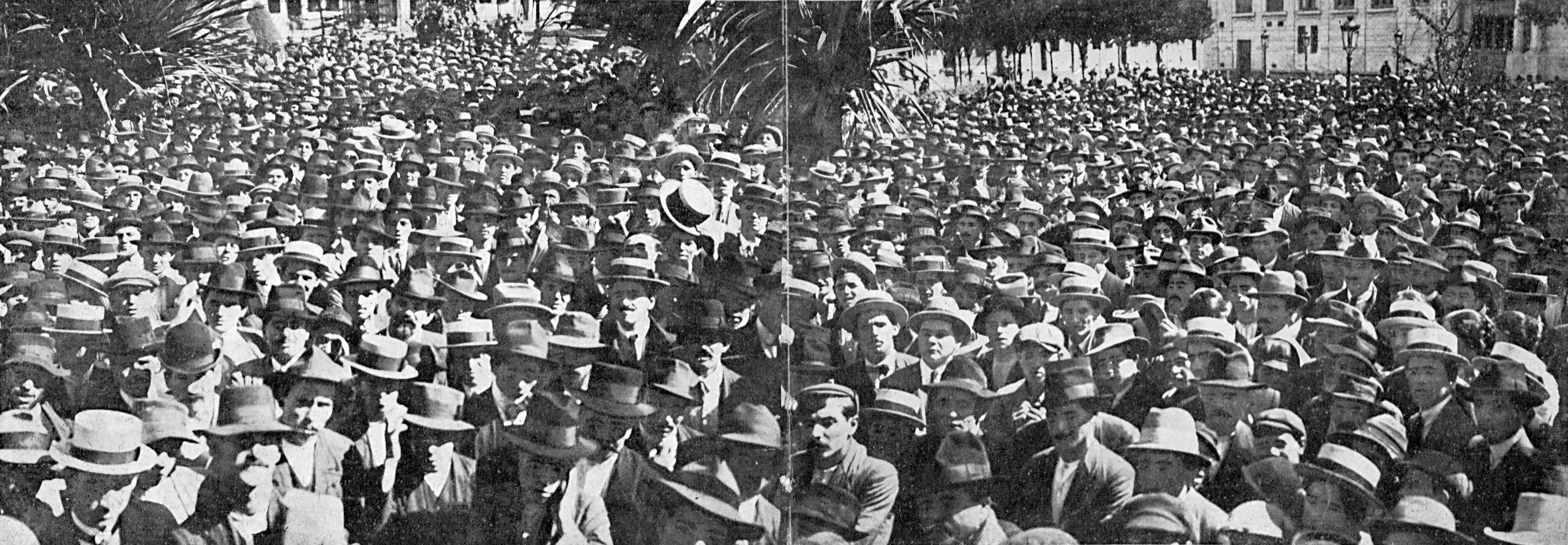
Striking workers at rally with the Comitê de Defesa Proletária (16 July 1917)

In this context, with worse working conditions, a higher cost of living and diminishing purchasing power, workers were at a historical low point. This culminated in the general strike of 1917, starting in the Mooca district of São Paulo in early June and spreading throughout Brazil in the following days. At its peak, it saw almost 44 thousand workers striking simultaneously. Demonstrations occurred almost daily, protesting low wages, child labor, high rent, and food prices, among other issues. (Note: The full list of demands of strikers in São Paulo, as reported in the newspaper A Plebe on 21 July 1917, is as follows: The release of all arrested strikers; The "most absolute" respect to the freedom of association of workers; No lay-offs for participation in the strike; The abolition of work for children under the age of 14; The abolition of night shifts for women and children under the age of 18; A 35% pay increase for salaries up to 5$000 Réis, and of 25% for salaries above that limit; The punctual payment of salaries every 2 weeks; A guarantee of permanent work; An 8-hour work day; A 5½-day work week and a 50% pay increase during overtime; The immediate cheapening of necessity goods, blocking the action of hoarders; The request, when necessary, of foodstuff for feeding the public; Measures to prevent adulteration and falsification of food products; The decrease of rent prices.) (Note: This revolutionary sentiment wasn't unique to Brazil; in part due to the effects of WWI, and in part due to news of the success of the Russian Revolution, worker revolts had been happening all across the world – see Revolutions of 1917–1923.) They were organized by workers themselves, with support from union, anarchist and socialist leaderships. Additionally, women played a significant role in organizing the strikes. Beyond being workers themselves, they were also usually in charge of home finances. Thus they saw firsthand the ever-growing prices of goods.

Brazilian workers, including anarchists, looked to the recent Russian Revolution with enthusiasm. In the Alagoas newspaper A Semana Social, in March 1917, Antônio Canellas wrote: "if the evil temper of the bourgeoisie doesn't prevent it", then Brazil would also see "the branching of the generous tree that just emerged in Russia — the tree of liberty". In November 1918, this inspiration was put to action, in a failed anarchist insurrection.

It is also in this context that anti-communist sentiment was born. Developed from a fear by the elites of revolutionary action by the proletariat, it led Brazilian newspapers at the time to denounceVladimir Lenin as an outlaw and crook. Astrojildo Pereira, one of the bigger enthusiasts of the Russian Revolution in Brazil, would write to newspapers under pseudonyms to combat the hostile framing of the event.

=== First communist parties ===
On 2 March 1919, the Communist International was founded, and 21 conditions were given for admission to it. Among them, that "any party seeking affiliation must call itself the Communist Party of the country in question".

A few days later, news broke of the foundation of Brazil's first self-declared Communist Party (Partido Comunista do Brasil, PCdoB) on 9 March 1919, open to "anarchists, socialists and all of those who accepted social communism". Founded by anarchist José Oiticica and delegates from Rio de Janeiro, Rio Grande do Sul, São Paulo and Alagoas, the party had major libertarian influences; anarchists at the time may not have fully realized their ideological differences from the Bolsheviks, and the Russian Revolution itself may have been seen as an anarchist movement. This first party was short-lived, marking the start of the split between communists and anarchists.

Many strikes had continued to be planned, executed, and severely repressed since 1917, led by anarchists and anarcho-syndicalists. By 1921 workers were wholly defeated and anarchism, which had been against political parties and was seen to lack discipline, received the blame. Additionally, due to WWI, the recent push for industrialization had made Brazil a worker-dense country, so conditions were fertile for the growth of communism in Brazil.

In 1918, Abílio de Nequete, Francisco Merino and Otávio Hengist had founded the União Maximalista de Porto Alegre (Maximalist Union of Porto Alegre), renamed Grupo Comunista de Porto Alegre (Communist Group of Porto Alegre) in 1921. In the aftermath of the general strikes, the country saw the formation of multiple self-proclaimed communist groups; in 1919, the Grupo Comunista Brasileiro Zumbi, and Núcleo Comunista de Pelotas; in 1921, the Grupo Clarté, inspired by the French group of the same name organized by Henri Barbusse, Raymond Lefebvre, Paul Vaillant-Couturier and others; and in the same year, the Grupo Comunista do Rio de Janeiro.

Grupo Clarté was founded by Everardo Dias, Afonso Schmidt, Lima Barreto, Pontes de Miranda, Cristiano Cordeiro, Joaquim Pimenta, Evaristo de Morais, Agripino Nazareth, Antônio Figueiredo, Leônidas Resende, Maurício Paiva de Lacerda and his brother, Paulo de Lacerda. Though some called themselves socialists, the group tended towards moderate reformism, in the context of a weakened, post-repression Left. Pimenta described his own politics as the "pragmatic method – to wrest from situation and events whatever they can provide on behalf of the working class". The group was largely sympathetic to the Russian Revolution, frequently reprinting documents on events in the Soviet Union, though not organizing any meaningful action towards any revolutionary goal in Brazil.

The Grupo Comunista do Rio de Janeiro was founded by Astrojildo Pereira and 11 others. Immediately after formation, the group started contacting other workers' groups throughout the country to share the 21 conditions and recommend their implementation. In response, several other communist groups started to form, in Recife, Juiz de Fora, Santos and Cruzeiro. In January 1922, the group launched the Movimento Comunista magazine to spread the agenda of the Communist International.

Between 25 and 27 March 1922, the various communist groups made the decision to start the Partido Comunista do Brasil (Communist Party of Brazil; dubbed the "Partido Communista – Secção Brasileira da Internacional Communista", or "Communist Party – Brazilian Section of the Communist International"), the first "truly" communist party of Brazil. Soon after its inception, the party would adopt the abbreviation PCB. The party, created through the meeting of 9 delegates representing 73 affiliates throughout the country, was hurried in light of the soon-approaching 4th World Congress of the Communist International, for which Brazil had been lacking representation. Due to the lack of political party-specific legislation at the time, the party was registered as a civil society.

Knowledge of Marxism was still in its infancy in Brazil at the time. As such, PCB was under educated in Marxist theory in its inception.

Parallel to the PCB's foundation on 1 March 1922, Brazil held a presidential election. It was won by Artur Bernardes of the Mineiro Republican Party, who was up against Nilo Peçanha. Bernardes' candidacy was part of the milk coffee politics of the time, a scheme which ensured only candidates from the two wealthiest states, Minas Gerais and São Paulo, would occupy the presidency. The opposition contested the election results and, over the following months, a military conspiracy emerged across the country to remove the still-in-office Epitácio Pessoa and prevent Bernardes' inauguration. This culminated in the Copacabana Fort revolt, which began on 4 July 1922.

On 5 July 1922, Epitácio Pessoa declared a state of emergency in response to the revolt, which would end up lasting for years and multiple presidencies. Among other repercussions, the PCB's operation would soon be declared illegal a mere three months after its foundation.

=== Vargas era ===
==== Communist uprising of 1935 ====
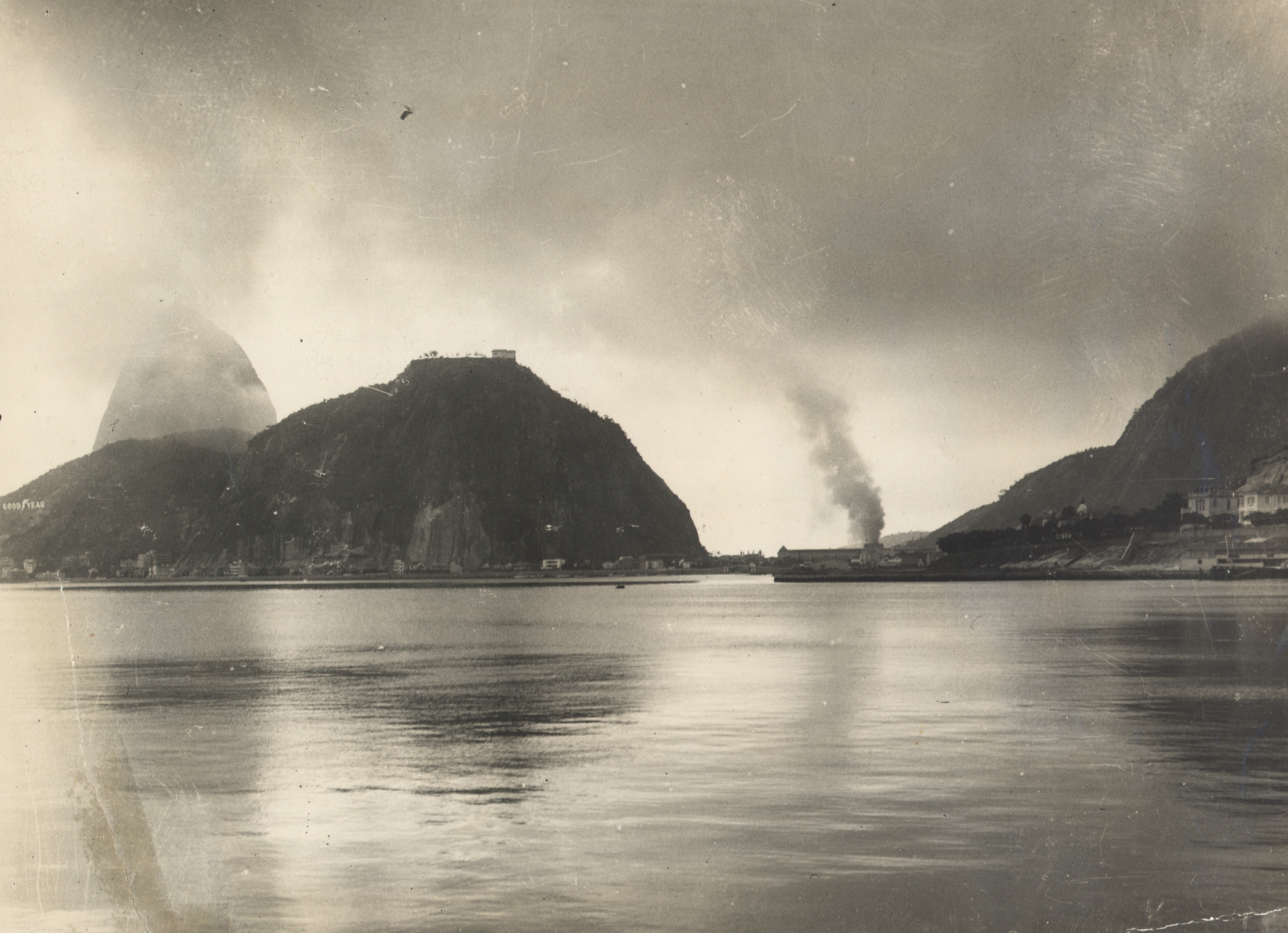
The 3rd Infantry Regiment barracks in Rio de Janeiro on fire after the communist insurrection

In 1935, a communist uprising (Portuguese: Intentona Comunista) was carried out by the ANL (National Liberation Alliance) with the support of the PCB as well as the Communist International. Under the leadership of Luis Carlos Prestes, a prominent communist figure, the Comintern provided funding, propaganda, and youth programs, which helped the movement grow rapidly. Revolts broke out in Natal and Recife where citizens were provided weapons to fight alongside the revolutionaries. In Natal, the revolt broke out on the 23rd of November due to a fake telegram by the counter-intelligence services which claimed that the date of the revolt was pushed forward from the 27th, and was contained within 4 days. In Recife on the 24th, the revolt begun and was dominated within 2 days. In Rio de Janeiro on the 27th, unaware of the status of the revolts in the north, the revolt begun and by 1:30, the rebels surrendered. After November 1935, the National Congress of Brazil approved a series of laws that restricted its own power, while the executive gained almost unlimited powers of repression. This process culminated in the coup of 10 November 1937, which closed the National Congress of Brazil, canceled the upcoming 1938 presidential elections, and installed Getúlio Vargas as a dictator. The PCB faced significant repression during Getúlio Vargas's government following the failure of the insurgency.

==== World War II and onwards ====
Despite being driven underground, the PCB clandestinely supported Brazilian involvement in World War II, due to which its membership increased to 82,000 and its leaders were released. It later underwent progressive and gradual reconstruction.

=== Fourth Brazilian Republic ===
The PCB was banned once again during Eurico Gaspar Dutra's government in 1947, as it maintained a significant presence in both rural and urban syndicalism and administration, and also due to Dutra's close ties to the American government. During Jânio Quadros's government in 1961, the party became legal once again, as it preferred not use violence to achieve its political goals. In 1962, the PCB split due to the emergence of a Maoist faction which later adopted Marxist–Leninist principles. This faction opposed the PCB's strategy of prioritizing an urban-bourgeois revolution.

During João Goulart's administration in Brazil, the PCB adopted distinct strategies across three phases. During the parliamentary phase, the PCB distanced itself from Goulart; in the early presidential phase, the communists continued to oppose him for supporting the PSD and proposed a "Single Front" of the left composed of the PCB, the Popular Mobilization Front (FMP), the General Workers' Command (CGT) and Miguel Arraes' faction. Goulart accepted the proposal and gained the PCB's support in late 1963.

=== Coup of 1964 and onwards ===
==== Uprisings in the Brazilian military dictatorship, 1968-1972 ====
During the Brazilian military dictatorship, following the enactment of Institutional Act No. 5 (AI-5), the Brazilian Communist Party (PCB), aligned with the Soviet Union, belatedly and without proper preparation, organized a congress in 1967. At this congress, the PCB resolved to support the coordination of demonstrations against martial law while the Communist Party of Brazil (PCdoB) pursued armed guerrilla warfare.

An armed struggle occurred against the Brazilian military dictatorship by different left-wing groups between 1968 and 1972, the most severe phase of the regime. Despite its resistance aspect, the majority of the groups that participated in the armed struggle aimed to achieve a socialist revolution in Brazil, inspired by the Chinese and Cuban revolutions. The confrontation deepened after the enactment of Institutional Act Number Five (AI-5) in 1968.

Revolutionary organizations initially aimed to incite rural guerrilla warfare but became more notable for urban operations, which included fundraising activities and actions designed to support rural guerrilla campaigns and sustain clandestine infrastructure. Despite some initial successes, these groups became socially isolated as the regime's repression intensified, accompanied by a disinformation campaign designed to undermine public support for the rebels. Paramilitary groups linked to the government carried out false flag operations to justify further crackdowns and deepen authoritarianism. The armed actions in the cities were short-lived.

The dismantling of the Araguaia guerrillas, supported by the PCdoB, in 1974 marked the collapse of the armed struggle. The conflict resulted in numerous casualties, as well as many cases of exile, imprisonment, and enforced disappearances during the dictatorship.

==== After 1972 ====
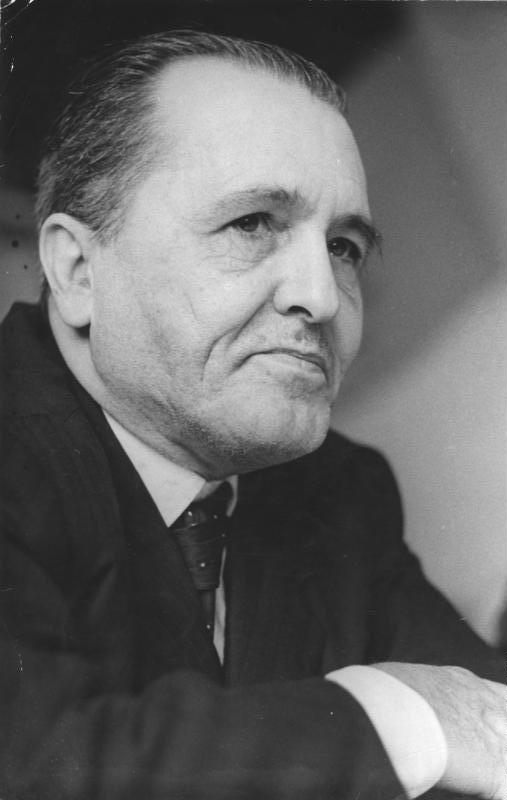
Luis Carlos Prestes, the leader of the PCB from 1943 to 1980

Between 1974 and 1976, during the height of the military government's repression, nearly 700 infiltrated militants were arrested, and more than 20 high-ranking communist leaders were killed. This wave of arrests forced the PCB into deeper clandestinity and exile. Consequently, Luís Carlos Prestes stepped down from the party's leadership, transferring it to Giocondo Dias. Despite President João Figueiredo's political liberalization, communist activists traveling to the Soviet Union continued to face arrests upon their return.

Brazilian cultural production—particularly in dramaturgy, soap operas, and cinema—was notably influenced by communist militant authors. However, their efforts were hampered by inexperience, police surveillance during periods of persecution, and the detachment of exiles from the country's evolving social and political landscape. Despite severe repression, communist influence remained strong in labor movements, notably within the Volkswagen union, which represented workers in the country's largest company at the time.

During the Diretas Já campaign for direct elections in the early 1980s, the PCB actively supported the movement. However, during the 1978–1980 ABC Paulista strikes, the Workers' Party (PT) rapidly gained prominence, taking advantage of the PCB's inability to adapt to new political realities. The PCB's decline was compounded by inexperienced leadership and a lack of deep political and methodological reflection on Brazil's changing context.

As the PT rose to power in state and municipal governments throughout the 1990s, it ceded itself to the tools of traditional politics and disillusioned its former remaining communist members who broke away from it, thus creating a new social-democratic tradition aimed at countries dependent on the First World. In the late 1990s, an attempt was made by some PCB leaders to dissolve the party through a vote by non-affiliated members, but the effort ultimately failed.

=== Modern day ===
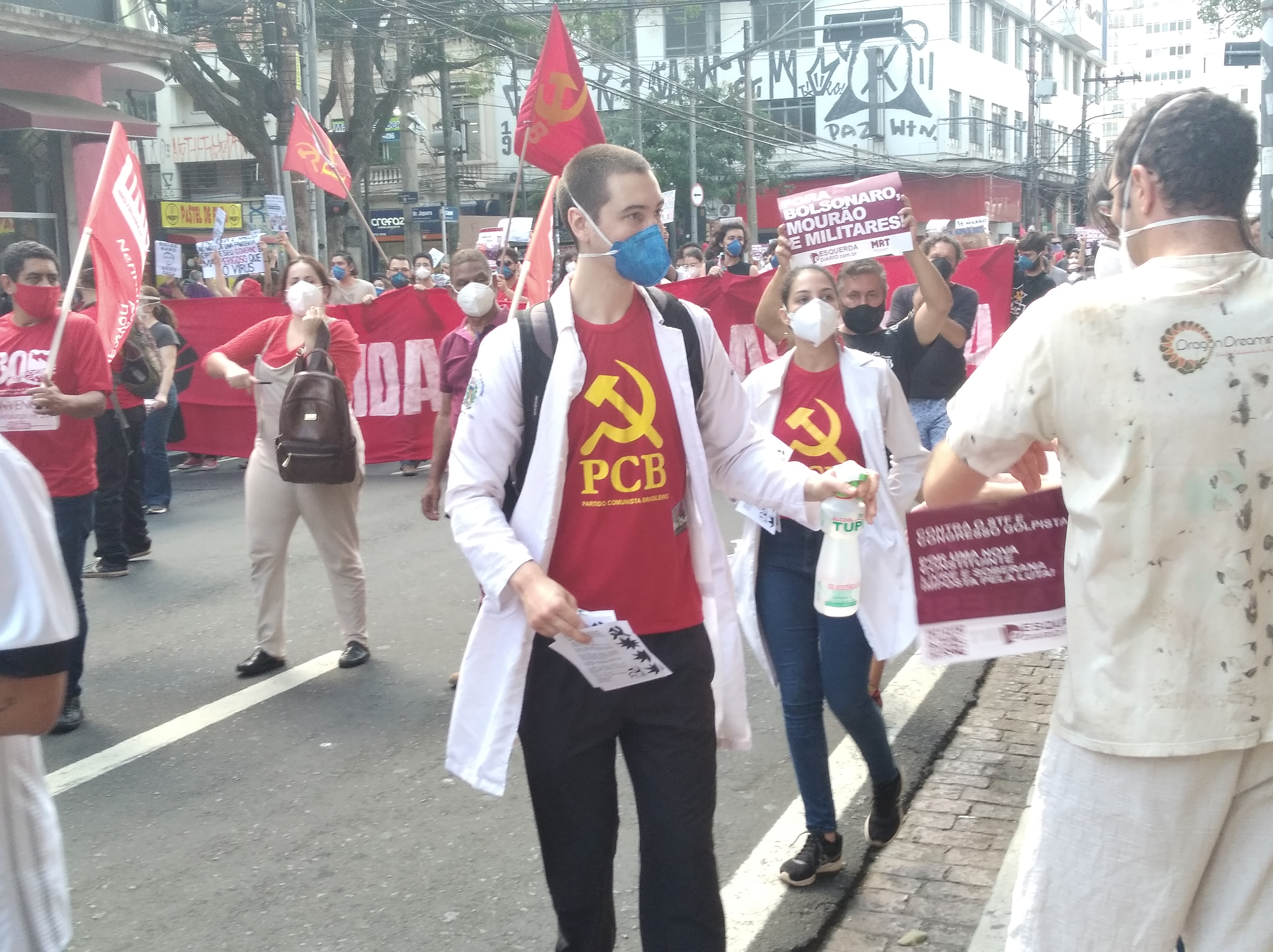
In March 2021, protests calling for former president Jair Bolsonaro's impeachment for mishandling the pandemic break out in over 200 Brazilian cities as COVID-19 deaths surpass 460 thousand

Communist parties such as the PCB and the PCdoB were part of Lula's coalition governments in 2002 and 2006. In 2006, Aldo Rebelo, a PCdoB member and President of the Chamber of Deputies, served briefly as acting President of Brazil when both the President and Vice President underwent medical procedures. During the 2006 elections, PCdoB secured its first executive office in a state capital by winning the mayoral race in Aracaju, the capital of Sergipe. Manuela d'Ávila, as a member of PCdoB, was the running mate for Fernando Haddad for the 2018 Brazilian general election against Jair Bolsonaro.

Currently, PCdoB remains a member of Brazil of Hope, a coalition that includes Lula's party, the Worker's Party (PT). Additionally, it is the second-largest non-ruling communist party in the world.

The PCB underwent a major crisis in 2023, after controversial expulsions of prominent party figures, and the opposition of its youth wing, the Union of Communist Youth (UJC). The party's leadership thus faced internal divisions and accusations of undemocratic practices. In July 2023, Ivan Pinheiro was one of those who were expelled from the PCB. He subsequently founded his own party, the Brazilian Communist Party – Revolutionary Reconstruction (PCB-RR).

== Communist political parties active in Brazil ==
There are currently seven self-declared communist and left-wing socialist political parties in Brazil registered with the Superior Electoral Court (TSE), shown in the table below. These seven are the only ones who, in surveys in 2019 and 2024, declared themselves as "left-wing"; (Note: Both PCB and PCO did not respond to the 2024 survey.) other progressive-leaning parties only claimed to be "center-left". Additionally, the Revolutionary Communist Party is not legally registered with the TSE.

Communist (or adjacent) political parties in Brazil
Logo	Name	Ideology	Registration status (TSE)	References
	Partido Comunista Brasileiro (Brazilian Communist Party, PCB)	Socialism, communism, Marxism–Leninism	Yes	
	Partido Comunista do Brasil (Communist Party of Brazil, PCdoB)	Socialism, communism, Marxism–Leninism	Yes	
	Partido da Causa Operária (Workers' Cause Party, PCO)	Socialism, communism, Trotskyism	Yes	
	Partido Socialismo e Liberdade (Socialism and Liberty Party, PSOL)	Democratic socialism	Yes	
	Partido Socialista dos Trabalhadores Unificado (United Socialist Workers' Party, PSTU)	Socialism, communism, Trotskyism	Yes	
	Partido dos Trabalhadores (Workers' Party, PT)	Democratic socialism	Yes	
	Unidade Popular (Popular Unity, UP)	Socialism	Yes	
	Partido Comunista Revolucionário (Revolutionary Communist Party, PCR)	Revolutionary communism	No	

Prior to the 2022 and 2024 elections, Folha de S.Paulo conducted studies aiming to pinpoint Brazilian parties' political alignment. Deemed "far left" were the following:

- PCB (2024)
- PCO (2022)
- PSOL (2022, 2024)
- PSTU (2022, 2024)
- UP (2022, 2024)

Although its name contains "Socialist", the Partido Socialista Brasileiro (Brazilian Socialist Party) is, self-declaredly center-left.

== Anti-communist sentiment ==
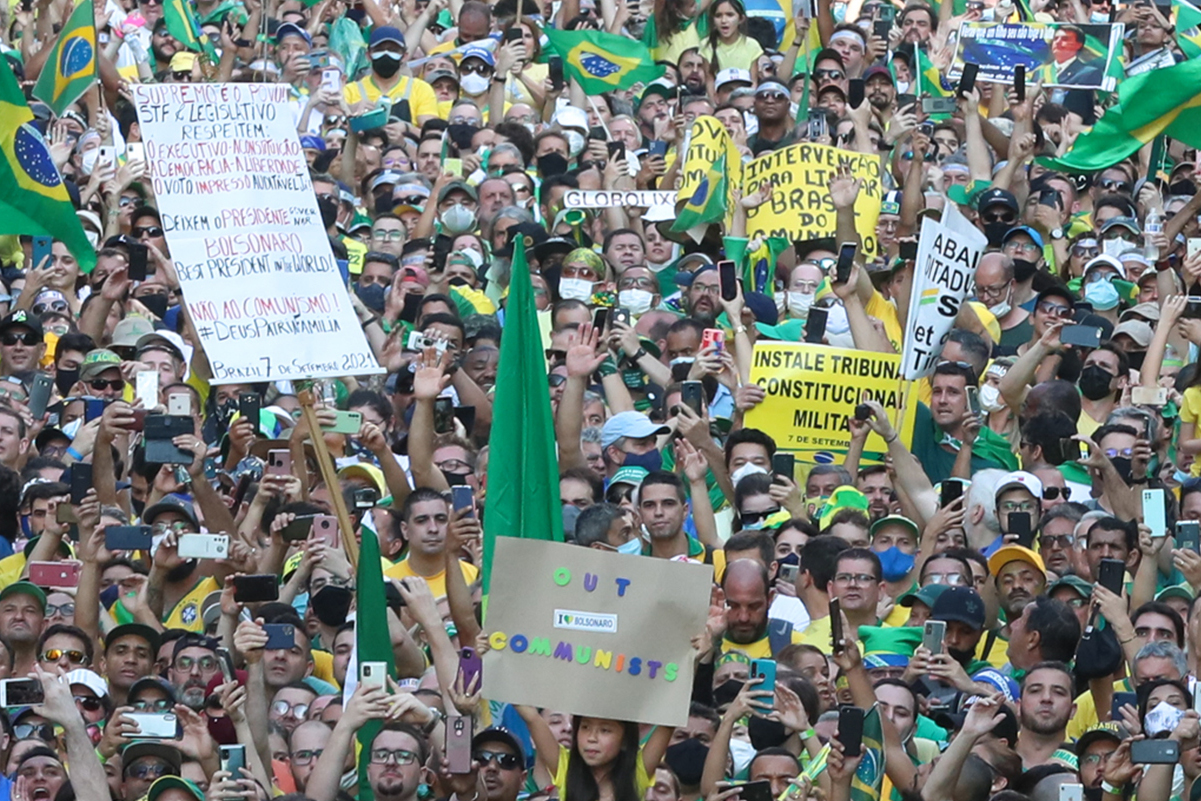
Independence Day demonstrations in 2021, in support of then-president Jair Bolsonaro, with signs saying "out communists" and "no to communism"

Brazil still faces somewhat strong anti-communist sentiment, even decades after the end of the multiple military dictatorships that sought to curb it. Near the end of Dilma Rousseff's presidency and the mass protests from late 2014 through 2016, the expression Nossa bandeira jamais será vermelha ("Our flag will never be red") became a popular anti-communist motto.

That same motto's popularity was later revitalized during Jair Bolsonaro's presidency. Bolsonaro, a staunch anti-communist, had previously stated that Brazil "could become like North Korea if the Workers' Party was not stopped". His presidential campaign in 2018 was filled with fake news aiming at a red scare, such as alleging his opponent, Fernando Haddad, was a Marxist.

In a survey in 2023, after Lula's win over Bolsonaro in the 2022 election, around 70% of Bolsonaro voters believed the country was at risk of becoming communist. This is in stark contrast with Lula's actual political positioning, which is closer to center-left.

== See also ==
- Socialism in Brazil
- Anarchism in Brazil
- Landless Workers' Movement
- Homeless Workers' Movement
