= UJR =

UJR may refer to:

- Rebellion Youth Union, the youth wing of the Revolutionary Communist Party in Brazil
- Unanimous justified representation, a criterion for evaluating the fairness of electoral systems
- Unsecured Judicial Release, a term for personal recognizance bonds used in some jurisdictions
- the airline code for Universal Jet Rental de Mexico
- União do Judaismo Reformista, the regional organisation of the World Union for Progressive Judaism in Brazil
