= Everardo Dias =

Brazilian journalist (1883–1966)

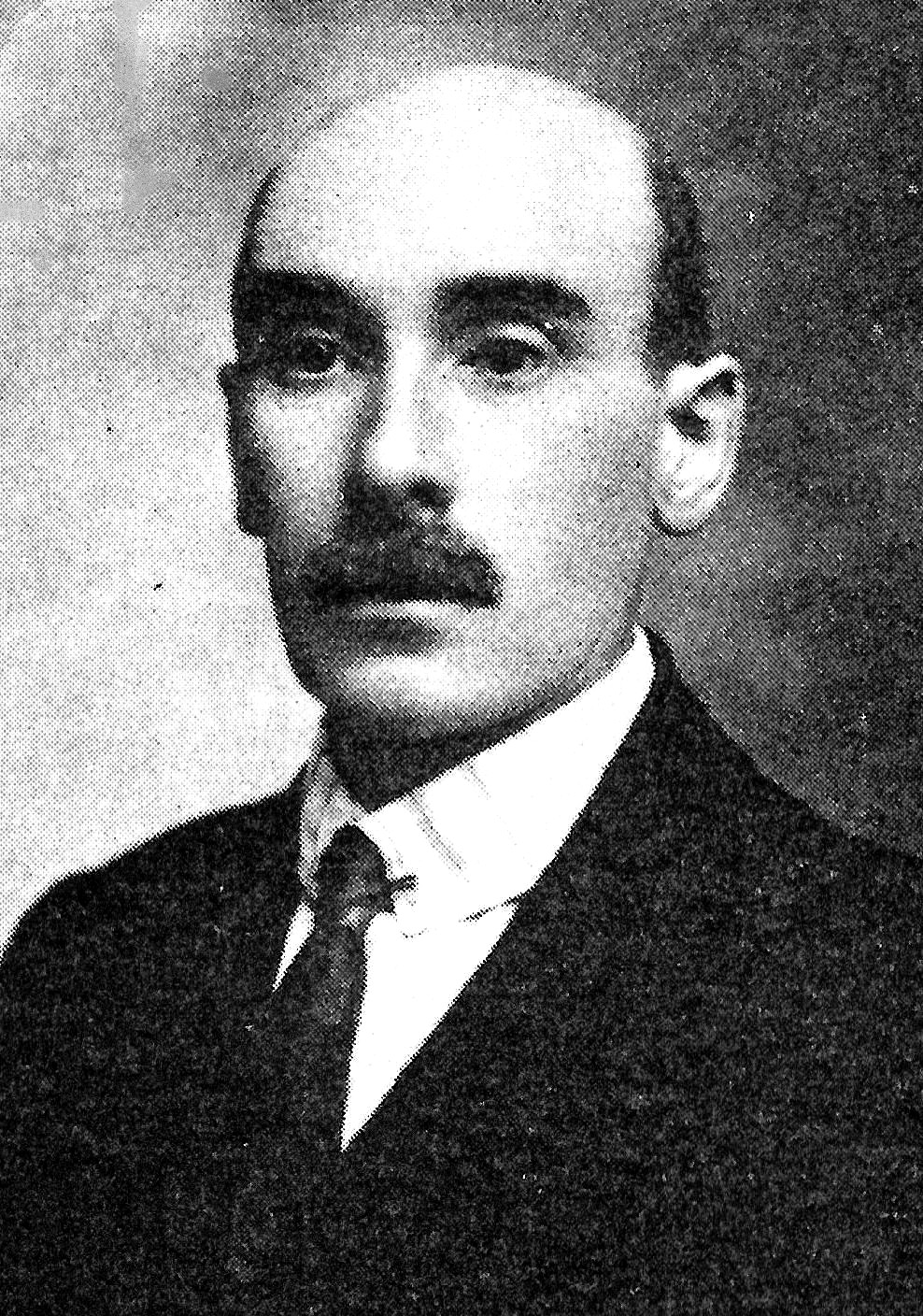
- Everardo Dias in 1928.
- Born: 1883; Pontevedra, Spain
- Died: 1966 (aged 82–83); São Paulo, Brazil
- Occupation: Journalist

Everardo Dias (Pontevedra, 1883 - São Paulo, 1966) was a journalist and important activist in the Brazilian workers' movement in the early decades of the 20th century. He participated in the 1917 Brazil strike and the 1918 anarchist insurrection.

== Biography ==
Everardo Dias was born in Pontevedra, Spain, in 1883. In 1887, at the age of two, he came to Brazil with his father, professor and Freemason Antônio Dias, who was involved in a failed republican uprising. With the help of other Freemasons, he embarked for São Paulo carrying correspondence for Martinico Prado, one of Brazil's Republican leaders. At 13, Everardo learned the printer's trade and went to work for the newspaper O Estado de S. Paulo, where he stayed until he completed his studies at the Normal School.

After graduating, he got a teaching job in Aparecida do Monte Alto. There, Vicente Picarelli, an old Freemason, created the Filhos do Universo Lodge, of the Grande Oriente de São Paulo, where Everardo was initiated in June 1904, at the age of 21. After a year in Aparecida, he returned to São Paulo and, failing to get a transfer, abandoned teaching and became a journalist. He tried to study at the Faculty of Law in São Paulo but, due to financial difficulties, he decided to drop out of the program. Years later, he graduated from the Free Faculty of Law in Rio de Janeiro. In São Paulo, he joined the União Espanhola Lodge, where he received the degree of Knight Rose-Cross in March 1906.

He stood out as a leader during the anti-clerical movement in São Paulo, participated in the Associação de Livres Pensadores and directed the fortnightly O Livre Pensador, published for the first time in 1902. In it, he extolled Lamarck, Darwin, Haeckel and Spencer while attacking the Catholic Church, smoking and alcohol. There was also a lot of criticism of priests who attacked Protestants, Freemasons, Spiritists, freethinkers and socialists. In 1905, Everardo was the press representative at the Russian martyrs' rally in São Paulo. In 1906, he attended the May 1st celebrations in Campinas.

On May 3, 1908, he joined the Ordem e Progresso Lodge, in São Paulo, where he held the position of 2nd Vigilante in 1910. When Republican leader Pedro de Toledo became Grand Master of the Grande Oriente de São Paulo, a program of lectures about civics, freedom of conscience and the defence of the law was organized in the state. Everardo lectured about the need for education, schools for the people and women's emancipation at the Amizade, Ordem e Progresso, União Espanhola, Fidelidade Firmeza and other lodges, as well as in the interior of the state and in Rio de Janeiro. He translated Victor Margueritte's book, La Garçonne, which caused great scandal in France.

During the General Strike of June 10, 1917 in São Paulo, he wrote the bulletin distributed to the population defending better wages and rights for workers. He was part of the Republican Party of São Paulo (PRP), alongside Pedro de Toledo, fighting against the reform of the 1891 Constitution. When the PRP took over the government, he was offered a position in the administration, but refused because he was against this type of endorsement and joined the Workers' Party. Between 1912 and 1919, he was a member of the Legislative Assembly of the Grande Oriente de São Paulo representing lodges Perseveranças III, from Sorocaba, União Espanhola, from São Paulo, and Deus, Justiça e Caridade, from Perderneiras. From 1916 to 1918, he was a member of the Tribunal Maçônico de Justiça Estadual. In 1918, he was elected Grand Secretary of the Grande Oriente de São Paulo.

On October 27, 1919, after the General Strike in São Paulo, Everardo was arrested along with José Righetti and João da Costa Pimenta, general secretary of the União dos Trabalhadores Gráficos de São Paulo, taken to Santos and put in an infected cubicle completely naked. Two days later, he was taken to the courtyard where he was whipped 25 times on his back. That same day, he was taken to São Paulo and then, along with 10 other prisoners and guarded by 25 soldiers, transferred to Rio de Janeiro, where they would be expelled from Brazil. At the Central Police Station in Rio de Janeiro, Everardo, weakened, told the delegate that "he hadn't eaten, drunk or slept for four days and nights".

On the afternoon of October 30, Everardo and 22 other prisoners were taken to the docks to board the Lloyd Brasileiro's Benevente. When they arrived in Bahia, Manuel Gama sent a letter in which he spoke of Everardo, "who, sad and pensive, is dragging his cross to Calvary!". Everardo writes: "I'm more dead than alive... I'm weak and I think I have tuberculosis! Oh, it's horrible!". While a habeas corpus petition was being filed in Everardo's favor, claiming that he had lived in the country for 33 years, was a naturalized Brazilian citizen, had six Brazilian daughters and worked as a bookkeeper, the deputy and Freemason Mauricio de Lacerda, Carlos Lacerda's father, read his dramatic letter in the Federal Chamber. Astrogildo Pereira, through the pages of Spartacus, recalled that Everardo had published Livre Pensador for 15 years and had been editor-in-chief of O Estado de S. Paulo. Loja América also stood out in his defense. On November 8, the Supreme Court denied the petition for habeas corpus.

When they arrived in Recife, they spent three days in three cells that could only fit three people. On November 24, after a stopover on the Madeira Island, they docked in Lisbon. The police picked up the Portuguese prisoners, but left the Spaniards, including Everardo, on the ship. On November 29, in Vigo, Spain, all the deportees disembarked, except Everardo Dias, Manuel Perdigão and Francisco Ferreira, because they were recognized as Brazilian. Sick, haggard, taciturn, without money or adequate clothing, fearful of spending the winter on the Benevente, they begged to disembark too, but were forbidden.

In December, in Le Havre, France, suffering in the harsh winter, they asked the Brazilian consul for warm clothes, but received no reply. After passing through Rotterdam, the Benevente returned to Vigo, where Perdigão and Ferreira disembarked. In the meantime, the newly sworn in Grand Master, José Adriano Marrey Júnior, accompanied by Senator and Freemason Luís de Toledo Piza, from the América Lodge, in an audience with Altino Arantes, the state governor, managed to get the police's attitude condemned and his expulsion revoked. Everardo could finally return to Brazil.

Everardo arrived in Recife on January 25, 1920, and was received with great homage. There, he participated in a session at the União dos Operários da Construção Civil, where he attributed the cause of his trials to his articles against the government published in A Plebe, blamed Ibraim Nobre for the beating he suffered in Santos and denounced the treatment he received from Manuel Perdigão, a native Brazilian. During his three days in Recife, he received many tributes and was greeted by Antônio Canellas, Professor Joaquim Pimenta and Cristiano Cordeiro, whose house he stayed in overnight.

The same year he returned, he helped found the Clarté Group, composed of members who would later organize the Brazilian Socialist Party. In 1921, Everardo was involved in founding the Perfeição Segredo Lodge, in Rio de Janeiro, which aimed to spread knowledge and indoctrinate Freemasons; the initiative failed after the crisis in 1921. At the time, he ran the Freemasonry printing house in Méier and his workshops published Octávio Brandão's book Rússia Proletária and the magazine Movimento Comunista. In 1923, the police raided the printing house and confiscated it.

In 1922, when the 18 of the Fort Revolt occurred, Everardo had organized a committee in favor of Nilo Peçanha, the former Grand Master of the Grande Oriente de São Paulo, an opponent of Artur Bernardes who was arrested and sent to the Cobras Island and then to the Santa Cruz Fortress. In 1923, together with Canellas and other comrades, he was arrested accused of preparing an uprising against the government of Artur Bernardes, but was soon released. Later, he took part in the meeting of the Brazilian Communist Party, at which Canellas was suspended. When the São Paulo Revolt of 1924 broke out, Everardo, who was in Rio de Janeiro, was arrested again and sent to the concentration camps on the islands off the Brazilian coast, where he was imprisoned for three years.

Released, with his health shaken, he returned to his family in a difficult financial situation because his assets had been confiscated during the state of siege. Later, he returned to work as a journalist at the Diário Nacional, organized by the Democratic Party and led by Marrey Júnior, where he remained until its closure after the Constitutionalist Revolution of 1932. At the end of 1927, he was launched by O Internacional as a candidate for the São Paulo City Council by the Bloco Operário Camponês. During this period, he was monitored and his house was constantly raided by the police. He supported the Revolution of 1930 and had to flee São Paulo to avoid being arrested again. In 1932, unemployed and persecuted by the police, he lived in a tenement in Rio de Janeiro where he raised chickens to survive.

During the Communist Uprising of 1935, he was arrested without any proof of his involvement for almost two years, until he was acquitted by the National Security Court. In the National Congress, he was defended by then deputy Café Filho, the son of a Freemason. When he was released, he returned to Masonic work at the Ordem e Progresso Lodge. He wrote the Masonic works Semeando, À Sombra da Acácia and, in collaboration with Octaviano Bastos and Optato Carajuru, the Livro Maçônico do Centenário. He was editor and director of the Boletim Oficial do Grande Oriente de São Paulo and the newspapers Folha de Acácia and Mensageiro Romano.

He died in 1966, five years after publishing História das Lutas Sociais no Brasil. On April 4 of that same year, the Everardo Dias Lodge was founded in his honor.
