= Octávio Brandão =

Brazilian pharmacist, politician and activist (1896-1980)

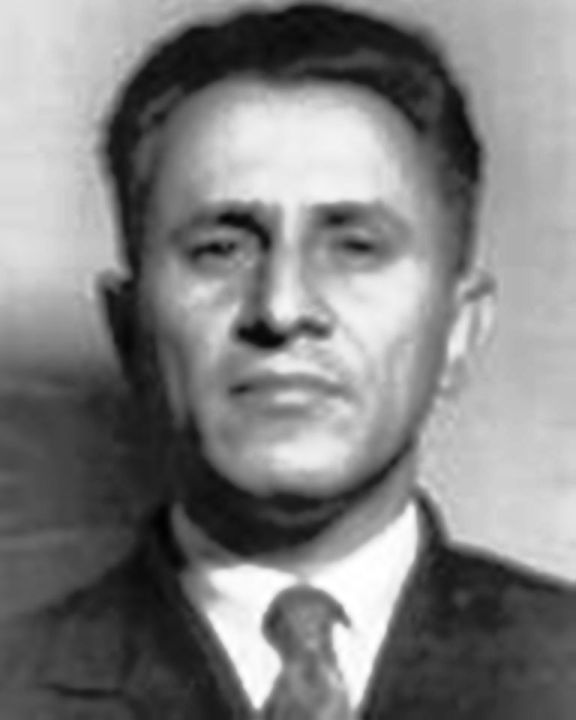
- Born: September 12, 1896; Viçosa, Alagoas; Brazil
- Died: March 15, 1980 (aged 83); Rio de Janeiro, Rio de Janeiro; Brazil
- Occupations: Pharmacist, politician and activist

Octávio Brandão Rego (Viçosa, September 12, 1896 - Rio de Janeiro, March 15, 1980) was a Brazilian pharmacist, politician and activist. He was also a militant and theoretician in the Brazilian Communist Party (PCB in Portuguese), a movement that influenced a generation of left-wing activists and was responsible for spreading Marxist concepts in Brazil.

== Biography ==
=== Early years ===
Octávio Brandão was born in the city of Viçosa, in the state of Alagoas, in 1896. He had a traditional Catholic family, but split from religion at the age of 16. At the beginning of the 20th century, when the landowning oligarchy and political power were more involved in government, Brandão surprised the society of Alagoas with his libertarian concepts and attitudes. He was a pioneer of agrarian reform in Brazil and went on pilgrimages through the interior of Alagoas preaching the distribution of land.

He was part of the Brazilian anarchist movement in the first decades of the 20th century. When he was less than 20 years old, Octávio Brandão joined the fight for an eight-hour working day, which resulted in him being threatened with death by the local bourgeoisie and leaving his town. His first intellectual work, "Aspectos Pernambucanos nos Fins do Século XVI", was published in 1914 in the Diário de Pernambuco. He graduated in pharmacy at the University of Recife, now the Federal University of Pernambuco (UFPE). In 1919, Astrojildo Pereira visited him at the pharmacy where he worked and lent him some Marxist books.

=== Militancy ===
In 1920, Brandão became a member of the Grupo Clarté de Paris and, through the Grupo Comunista Brasileiro Zumbi, he joined the Brazilian Communist Party (PCB) in the second half of 1922, becoming its national leader. In 1923, Octávio Brandão made the first Brazilian translation of The Communist Manifesto by Marx and Engels from the French edition by Laura Lafargue, published in the trade union newspaper Voz Cosmopolita.

In 1924, he began writing Agrarismo e industrialismo: ensaio marxista-leninista sobre a revolta de São Paulo e a guerra de classes no Brasil and tried to apply the principles of Lenin's Imperialism, the Highest Stage of Capitalism to the Brazilian reality, but instead placed industrialism as a pole that should be supported against conservative agrarianism. The draft text was distributed and served as a basis for the theses that Astrojildo Pereira presented to the Second Congress of the Communist Party of Brazil in 1925. The complete book was only published in April 1926 under the pseudonym Fritz Mayer and with a false indication of the place of publication in order to evade Artur Bernardes' political police.

Brandão's dialectic was based on "thesis-antithesis-synthesis", a simplifying formula difficult to find in Hegel, but which Brandão applied to everything. Inspired by his dialectic, he presented the trajectory of the workers' movement in Brazil in a triadic scheme and concluded that the thesis was the initial period of anarchist hegemony, the antithesis was the period of persecution unleashed by Epitácio Pessoa and the synthesis was the proletarian revolution, inaugurated by the founding of the PCB.

In 1925, he led the creation of A Classe Operária, the Communist Party's first mass newspaper, of which he was the first editor. Two years later, he became editor-in-chief of the daily A Nação. Communist ideas began to spread more widely among workers. In 1928, he was elected as one of the intendants to the Council of the then Federal District by the Bloco Operário e Camponês, an electoral front created by the PCB. Soon after the leftist turn of the Third International, Brandão's ideas on the Brazilian revolution were condemned and accused of being right-wing. He had to make a self-criticism and was removed from his position in the party leadership.

After being persecuted by the Vargas government, Brandão was deported to Germany for his political activities in 1931. However, he went to the Soviet Union, where he remained in exile for 15 years. From there, he criticized the outbreak of the November 1935 military uprisings under the command of Luís Carlos Prestes, already a member of the PCB. During the World War II, he worked for Radio Moscow, where he produced programs in Portuguese. He also collaborated in the organization of the Third International.

In 1947, after returning to Brazil, he was elected as one of the PCB's councillors to the Rio de Janeiro City Council. However, he was banned in 1948, along with all of the PCB's parliamentarians, after the party's registration was canceled by the Superior Electoral Court (TSE in Portuguese). He went underground until 1958.

In 1956, Khrushchev denounced Stalin's crimes and triggered an unprecedented crisis in the international communist movement. Brandão, affected by the situation, slowly drifted away from militancy. The PCB leadership's negligence towards its former militants also contributed to his attitude. He once again went underground with the 1964 coup and only reappeared publicly in 1979.

=== Death ===
Octávio Brandão died in Rio de Janeiro in 1980 at the age of 83. His entire collection is housed in the Edgard Leuenroth Archive (AEL), linked to the State University of Campinas (Unicamp), including books, documents, letters and notes.

== Works ==
=== Books ===
- Canais e Lagoas (1916–17);
- Agrarismo e industrialismo: ensaio marxista leninista sobre a revolta de São Paulo e a guerra de classes no Brasil (1924);
- O niilista Machado de Assis (1958);
- Combates e Batalhas (1978).

=== Texts and articles ===
- Uma Lei sobre a Imprensa Brasileira (1923);
- Reação e Repressão: Carta do Brasil (1924);
- Política de Quadros (1956);
- Uma Etapa da História de Lutas (1957);
- A Penúria da Crítica (1958);
- A Ascenção Histórica do Brasil (1960);
- Canais e Lagoas (1960);
- Literatura sem ideologia (1960);
- O Primado da Natureza - Ciência e Filosofia (1961);
- Pelo Realismo Revolucionário (1961);
- Vida Vivida - Recordações (1961);
- O Brasil Explorado e Oprimido (1962);
- O Petróleo e a Petrobrás (1962);
- Combates da Classe Operária (1963).

== See also ==
- Brazilian Communist Party
- Anarchism in Brazil
