= Revolutionary Communist Party (Brazil) =

Revolutionary Communist Party Partido Comunista Revolucionário
- Abbreviation: PCR
- Founder: Emmanuel Bezerra; Manoel Lisboa de Moura
- Founded: May 1966
- Split from: Communist Party of Brazil
- Merged into: October 8th Revolutionary Movement (later split in 1995)
- Headquarters: Recife, Pernambuco
- Newspaper: A Verdade
- Youth wing: Rebellion Youth Union (since 1995)
- Ideology: Communism; Marxism–Leninism; Stalinism; Hoxhaism; Anti-revisionism
- Political position: Far-left
- International affiliation: ICMLPO
- Colors: Red, Gold

Party flag

Website
- pcrbrasil.org

The Revolutionary Communist Party (Portuguese: Partido Comunista Revolucionário) is an anti-revisionist Marxist–Leninist communist party in Brazil with strong Stalinist tendencies. Originally formed in 1966 after a split with the Communist Party of Brazil, it later merged with the October 8th Revolutionary Movement in 1981, from which it split in 1995. It is a member of the International Conference of Marxist–Leninist Parties and Organizations (Unity & Struggle) (ICMLPO), an organization of anti-revisionist and Hoxhaist parties. As the party is not registered in Brazil's Superior Electoral Court, its members cannot run for public office.

== History ==
Unsatisfied with the Communist Party of Brazil's (PCdoB) practices in waging a guerrilla war in a rural area of northern Brazil, a group of PCdoB members left the party and formed the Revolutionary Communist Party (PCR) in 1966, active in the capitals and sugar cane plantations of the states of Alagoas, Pernambuco, Paraíba and Rio Grande do Norte. The PCR held the belief that a successful socialist revolution, should be organized in the major cities, with urban and industrial workers, as well as peasants, and maintained that the Brazilian Communist Party (PCB) had abandoned Marxism–Leninism in favor of Soviet revisionism.

Brazil had fallen under a right-wing military dictatorship in 1964. Supported by the United States in the Cold War as a strong opponent to communism, the dictatorship committed numerous human rights abuses, including torture, towards suspected communists and other political subversives. Despite the danger, the PCR remained committed to the armed struggle against the government. The party was instrumental in organizing labor strikes and student demonstrations, but they also engaged in more destructive activities such as burning government-owned sugarcane fields.

The party was partially dismantled in the early-1970s after a brutal torture campaign was waged by the government against suspected communists and leftist political parties. The party's leader, Amaro Luiz de Carvalho, was arrested by the authorities. Several other prominent party members were murdered. This culminated with the arrest of Carvalho's successor, Edival Nunes Cajá, on May 12, 1978. In response, more than 12,000 students from the Federal University of Pernambuco went on strike in Recife, where Cajá was being held. The student protest eventually procured his release, although he was arrested again soon afterwards for publicly detailing the torture he had suffered while in prison. He would not be permanently released until June 1, 1979.

In July 1981, due to the limited success of PCR resistance operations against the government, the party made the decision to merge with the October 8th Revolutionary Movement (MR-8), an urban guerrilla organization that had likewise split from the PCdoB years earlier. MR-8 also publicly declared itself Marxist–Leninist, but its "bourgeois" organizational structure and affinity toward "bourgeois nationalism" led to serious disagreements with the former members of the PCR. After internal struggles within the party, the PCR elected to split with MR-8 in 1995, resulting in the re-foundation of the party.

The re-founded party established a youth wing, known as the Youth Union Rebellion (Brazilian Portuguese: União da Juventude Rebelião) (UJR). The PCR held its Second Congress in 1998, which resulted in an overhaul of its statutes. The party remained ideologically devoted to Marxism–Leninism, but it adopted a much more extensive theoretical approach to its methods, contrasting with the previous statutes that regarded the armed struggle as its top priority. The re-foundation of the party came well after the end of military rule, so the party decided to take advantage of the press freedom that hadn't existed before the merger. The first issue of the theoretical organ of the party, The Truth, was published in December 1998.

In 2004, the PCR became a member of the International Conference of Marxist–Leninist Parties and Organizations (Unity & Struggle) (ICMLPO), an organization of anti-revisionist and Hoxhaist parties throughout the world. From then on it would also contribute to the theoretical organ of the ICMLPO, Unity & Struggle, which is published biannually.

== Rebellion Youth Union ==
Rebellion Youth Union (Brazilian Portuguese: União da Juventude Rebelião, UJR) is the youth wing of the PCR. It is present in 18 Brazilian states and acts within hundreds of student unions.

UJR was founded in 1995, alongside a PCR reorganization. On the same year, they took part in the 31st congress of the Brazilian Union of High School Students (UBES) and the 44th congress of the National Union of Students (UNE), with the objective of opening a new route to the student unions. As a collective, it promotes the Correnteza Movement and the Rebele-se na UBES movement, who comprise the Leftist Opposition inside UNE and UBES.

== See also ==
- Communism in Brazil
- List of anti-revisionist groups
