= Astrojildo Pereira =

Brazilian politician, writer and journalist

Astrojildo Pereira Duarte Silva
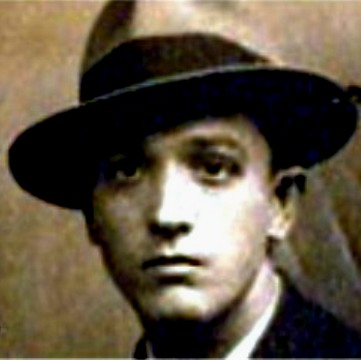
- Astrojildo Pereira.
- Born: November 8, 1890
- Died: November 21, 1965 (aged 75)
- Occupations: Politician, Writer, Journalist
- Known for: Founding member of the Brazilian Communist Party

Astrojildo Pereira Duarte Silva (8 November 1890 – 21 November 1965) was a Brazilian politician, writer, literary critic, and journalist. He was a founding member of the Brazilian Communist Party in 1922.

== See also ==
- Abílio de Nequete
