= Battle of Praça da Sé =

1934 conflict in São Paulo, Brazil

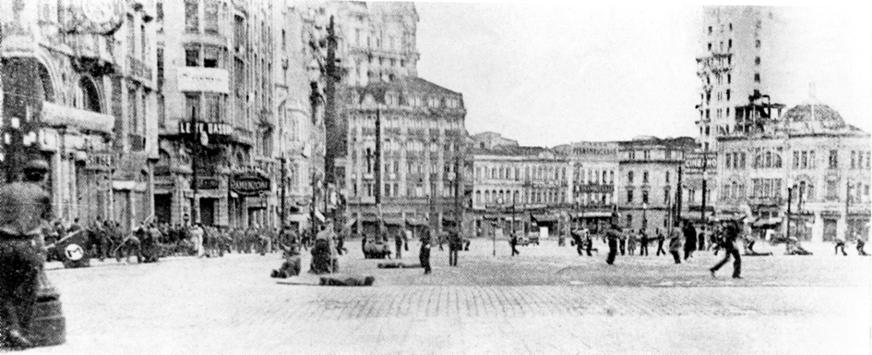
- The integralists flee from Praça da Sé, after the beginning of the conflict.
- Date: October 7, 1934
- Location: Sé Square, São Paulo, Brazil; 23°33′01.42″S 46°38′02.21″W
- Caused by: Political radicalization of conflicting groups
- Goals: Preventing the demonstration of the Brazilian Integralist Action (AIB)
- Methods: Political demonstrations
- Result: Anti-fascist victory

Parties
Anti-fascists: Anarchists; Communists; Socialists; Trade unionists; Trotskyists	AIB	Brazil: Army; São Paulo: Police

Lead figures
João Cabanas; E. Leuenroth; Oreste Ristori; Joaquim Ferreira; H. Sacchetta; E. de Moraes	Plínio Salgado	Getúlio Vargas; Augusto Inácio; V. C. de Lima

Casualties
- Deaths: 7
- Injuries: 30

The Battle of Praça da Sé was a conflict between anti-fascists and integralists in the city center of São Paulo, Brazil, on October 7, 1934. Brazilian Integralist Action (AIB) had scheduled a rally for that day to commemorate two years of the Integralist Manifesto; as soon as they learned of this intention, antifascists in São Paulo tried to prevent the event from taking place. With no central leadership, left-wing forces in São Paulo took part in the conflict, which resulted in seven deaths – those of an anti-fascist student, three Integralists, two police officers and a civil guard – and around thirty were wounded.

For left-wing activists, this event became a symbol of the anti-fascist campaign and the reactionary elements of national politics. The battle, as well as the identification of the body of the young militant Tobias Warchavski, triggered a political campaign against the repressive policy of the Getúlio Vargas government. The campaign, combined with anti-fascist sentiment, boosted a general movement against the reaction and aimed for the formation of a broad progressive front, which was achieved with the formation of the National Liberation Alliance by the Brazilian Communist Party.

== Context ==
During the 1930s, political radicalization occurred in Brazil due to the crisis of liberalism after the Wall Street Crash of 1929. The rise of fascism and the radicalization of communist movements affected Brazil during the National Constituent Assembly between 1933 and 1934. The ideological and political crisis of liberalism in Brazil became a political issue for Brazilians, who sought alternatives to liberalism on the right with fascism and on the left with anarchism, socialism and communism, leading to a confrontation between fascism and anti-fascism.

Although fascism and anti-fascism had clashed in Brazil since the 1920s, with the creation of Brazilian Integralist Action (Portuguese: Ação Integralista Brasileira, AIB) in 1932, the dispute became part of national politics. Leftist organizations were concerned with creating organizations to combat fascism, such as the Anti-War Committee, which was led by the Communist Party of Brazil (Portuguese: Partido Comunista do Brasil, PCB); the Antifascist Committee, which was organized by anarchists around the Workers' Federation of São Paulo (FOSP); and the Antifascist United Front (Portuguese: Frente Única Antifascista; FUA), which was organized by Trotskyists of the Communist League (Portuguese: Liga Comunista, LC) and by militants of the Brazilian Socialist Party (Portuguese: Partido Socialista Brasileiro, PSB) in São Paulo. The AIB and the leftists vied for popular attention in organized events that sought to surpass those of the competitors, leading to open conflict.

== Background ==
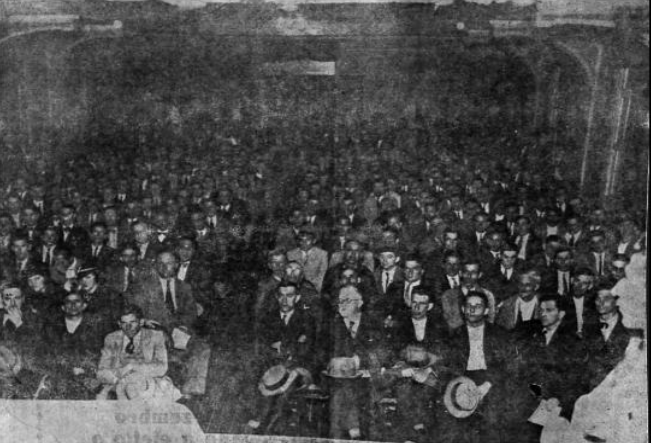
Anti-integralist conference held on November 14, 1933, in the hall of the União das Classes Laboriosas.

Conflicts between anti-fascists and integralists had been ongoing since 1933. One of the first-recorded conflicts took place during an Anti-Integralist conference that was organized by the Center for Social Culture (Portuguese: Centro de Cultura Social, CCS) on November 14, 1933, and with the participation of representatives from several left-wing political activists, such as socialist Carmelo Crispino, anarchist Hermínio Marcos and a representative of the newspaper O Homem Livre. About 1,000 people attended the event, which was held at the União das Classes Laboriosas hall. Some integralists tried to disrupt the conference but when they noticed the amount of anti-fascist activists there, they withdrew and began to look for reinforcements in the vicinity, and a group of workers repelled them.

Throughout the year, reports of aggression by Integralists against left-wing militants in various parts of Brazil emerged so the FUA decided to organize a counter-demonstration for December 15, 1933, the date on which the AIB had arranged an integralist rally. The FUA's disclosure by the FUA of the planned counter-demonstration caused the AIB to cancel the march. The FUA rally took place at the headquarters of the Lega Lombarda and was attended by about 2,000 participants, including members of the PCB and the Anti-War Committee. At this event, the FUA demonstrated its intentions of collaborating with other anti-fascist organizations from other states to form a National Anti-Fascist Single Front and to call upon the São Paulo workers movement to form a trade union.

In 1934, the political climate in Brazil radicalized. On April 20, thirteen days after the start of a vote on the Constitution, around 4,000 Integralists paraded through the streets of Rio de Janeiro. On June 24, an integralist parade with around 3,000 people took place in the capital São Paulo, and on July 2, a public holiday in Bahia, around 400 Integralists paraded through Salvador. On July 9, in Niterói, the first National Conference of the PCB ended, appointing a new ruling group and marking a radicalization in the party's policies. The PCB also organized, on August 23, the first large-scale political event sponsored by the Anti-War Committee, the first National Congress Against Imperialist War, Reaction and Fascism. The event took place at Teatro João Caetano after an assembly and a rally in Cristiano Ottoni Square and a 3,000-strong march along Rua Marechal Floriano Peixoto and Avenida Passos. The event ended in conflict with police, causing fatalities.

In October, the situation deteriorated; there were open conflicts between anti-fascists and integralists. On October 3, a national holiday to commemorate the anniversary of the Revolution of 1930, there was a violent confrontation in Bauru, São Paulo. At the time, the national leader of the AIB, Plínio Salgado, whose visit had been planned for months by local newspapers, was due to deliver a "doctrinal lecture". The Union of Employees and Workers of the Noroeste do Brasil Railroad scheduled an extraordinary general meeting (EGM) at 7:00 pm, one hour before the integralist lecture. At the same time, an integralist parade began and left the association's local headquarters accompanied by drums and taroes, and marchers sought to take Plínio Salgado from the hotel where he was staying to the lecture hall. Along the route, the parade began to be admonished by people shouting anti-fascist slogans. Tempers rose until a firefight broke out; the firefight resulted in the death of Nicola Rosica and the wounding of four others, all of them Integralists. One of the main accused of having participated in the aggression against the Integralists was a candidate for state deputy for the Coalition of the Left, which had been created in São Paulo by the Coalition of Proletarian Unions, Internationalist Communist League (Portuguese: Liga Comunista Internacionalista, LCI) and the PSB at the end of August.

== Beginning of the conflict ==
=== Call and preparations ===
On October 7, 1934, the Integralists intended to hold a rally at Praça da Sé, in downtown São Paulo, to commemorate the two years of the Integralist Manifesto. As soon as they learned of this intention, the anti-fascist forces in São Paulo organized themselves to prevent the rally from being held. There are some differences between the sources that report what happened; Fulvio Abramo relates the counter-demonstration directly to the FUA's performance; Eduardo Maffei tries to dilute the role of the FUA and attributes the convening of this counter-demonstration to the work of the PCB; Mário Pedrosa, in turn, stated that "no organization or party can claim the merit of having achieved that formidable mobilization of workers alone".

All left-wing organizations in São Paulo were summoned to participate in the counter-demonstration, and each organization issued a communiqué to its members, published manifestos and arranged preparatory meetings. The first assembly to examine the situation took place at the Employees Trade Union, with the presence of 40 militants. All approved the proposal for the counter-demonstration; they agreed it should take place in the same place and time as the announced integralist demonstration, with the purpose of disrupting the AIB rally; as far as possible, each organization would try to provide weapons for the counter-demonstrators. The Livraria Elo, on Rua Senador Feijó, the headquarters of the Legião Cívica 5 de Julho, on Rua Anita Garibaldi, the headquarters of the Union of Graphic Workers (Portuguese: União dos Trabalhadores Gráficos, UTG), on Venceslau Brás and the unions in the Santa Helena Building were used as depots where antifascist militants received weapons. By October 5, all the weapons received had already been removed from these places.

A civil commission organized popular mobilization and a military commission devised a strategy for the conflict, in which João Cabanas, Roberto Sisson and Euclydes Bopp Krebs played an active role. Cabanas drew up a plan that divided the forces into three main positions; the first ran from the façade of the Santa Helena building to Rua Wenceslau Braz; the second would be located at the back of the square in the section corresponding to the sidewalks between the exit of Direita Street and Rua Wenceslau Braz; and the third was in front of the Equitativa building between Senador Feijó and Barão de Paranapiacaba streets. Members of the PSB would occupy the first position; the second would be occupied by the communists, and the third by the Trotskyists and anarchists. (Note: In general, the anti-fascists do not rigorously follow the planning of João Cabanas. Fúlvio Abramo stated that the PCB would have preferred to act on its own, and the historian Ricardo Figueiredo de Castro noted despite the antifascist forces having participated together in the counter-demonstration, they acted without a fully centralized direction.)

Other meetings were held at the FOSP headquarters. According to Maffei, those who attended the preparatory meetings included Joaquim Câmara Ferreira, Hermínio Sacchetta, Arnaldo Pedroso d'Horta, Noé Gertel, Miguel Costa Jr., Igyno Ortega, Fernando Cordeiro, Leonor Petrarca, Eduardo Maffei and Eneida de Moraes, from the PCB; Marcelino Serrano, Carmelo Crispino, João Cabanas, from the PSB; the anarchists Edgard Leuenroth, Pedro Catalo, Rodolfo Felipe, Oreste Ristori and Gusman Soler; Mário Pedrosa and Fúlvio Abramo, from LCI. There were also trade unionists linked to the Coalition of Proletarian Unions, which included the Union of Employees of Commerce and the Union of Tailors. During the meetings, discussions between Communists and Trotskyists occurred. All militants were advised to take care of their own security before and after the conflict, and to avoid arrests and provocations that could prevent their participation.

=== Confrontation ===
In the morning, the anti-fascists began preparations for the counter-demonstration in Praça da Sé while the Integralists gathered nearby, occupying a large stretch of Avenida Brigadeiro Luiz Antônio, which ran from Avenida Paulista to their headquarters, located near the intersection of Brigadeiro with the Riachuelo near São Francisco Square. At North Station, hundreds of uniformed integralists from the state's interior disembarked. Newspapers reported about the AIB concentrationto commemorate the second anniversary of its creation, and the profusion of manifestos and pamphlets from anti-fascist associations throughout the city had aroused the populace's interest; at noon, large numbers of people occupied the square . By this time, anti-fascist militants had begun to enter the square, locating themselves in areas planned for each group.

Shortly before 2:00 pm, police searched buildings in Praça da Sé. Delegates Eduardo Louzada da Rocha and Saldanha da Gama; they entered the Santa Helena, and inspected the building rooms and the headquarters of the unions that surrounded the square. The police found no weapons but they had the union doors sealed and placed several soldiers at the gate of the Santa Helena building, prohibiting anyone from entering. The police then crossed the square and repeated the operation in the Equitativa building. The police chief Saldanha found PSB member Ruy Fogaça nearby, arrested him and sent him to a police station. According to Fúlvio Abramo:

At this point, four hundred men, belonging to the 1st, 2nd and 6th Infantry Battalions, Fire Department and Cavalry Regiment, already occupied the entire square, under the command of Colonel Arlindo de Oliveira. The Civil Guard was also present with a large device armed with rifles and machine guns. Soon, all the streets leading to Praça da Sé were heavily policed. On João Mendes, cavalrymen, with thick carabiners, were taking care of the passages that gave access to the Cathedral. On Santa Teresa Street ... a contingent of the Civil Guard sported machine-guns.

A large number of anti-fascist demonstrators were in front of the Santa Helena building and very close to the Integralists; they started shouting provocations, such as "morra o integralismo" (English: "Die Integralism") and "fora galinhas verdes" (English: "Get Out Green Chickens"). The Integralists promptly reacted and fighting began, with canes, kicks, punches and jerks. The police soon intervened and some shots were fired, causing panic among those present. About ten minutes later, the Integralists regrouped, and the bulk of them entered the square and stood on the steps of the São Paulo Cathedral, singing their official anthem and giving "anauês". During the lull that followed this first conflict, most Integralists entered the square behind the cathedral in Largo João Mendes, and appeared at the side of the Santa Helena building. The atmosphere remained tense, with anti-fascist demonstrators shouting slogans against the Integralists as they sang their hymns.

A confrontation erupted after machine-gun fire hit three civil guards, killing one of them and causing panic. (Note: There are several versions of the incident. One of them, supported by the newspaper Folha da Manhã, says the police had placed a machine gun on a tripod in front of the Cathedral. One of the people, who was hurriedly leaving the area, fearing a conflict, would have tripped over the gun, which began to fire. Yet another version claims the machine gun was placed on the corner of Senador Feijó Street, and a horseman who could not control his mount's nervousness would have been taken by the animal to where the weapon was, knocking it down and causing the shots. The Integralists said the shootings were intentional and came from the antifascists. Historian Alexandre Samis stated the anarchists João Perez Bouzas and Simón Radowitzky took a machine gun from the hands of the Public Force, and attacked the civil guards and then the Integralists. Other sources said Ossef Stepanovetchi, a Ukrainian anarchist active in the Russian Brazilian communities during the 1920s, was accompanying João Perez Bouzas.) According to the newspaper A Plebe,

The shooting started then. The bullets hissed in all directions, coming from all over the square, from street corners, from the doors of buildings, where groups of armed people were entrenched and fired at the "green shirts". Cracks similar to those of hand grenades were heard and it seems that, in fact, they were used in combat, as shrapnel were found in Praça da Sé.

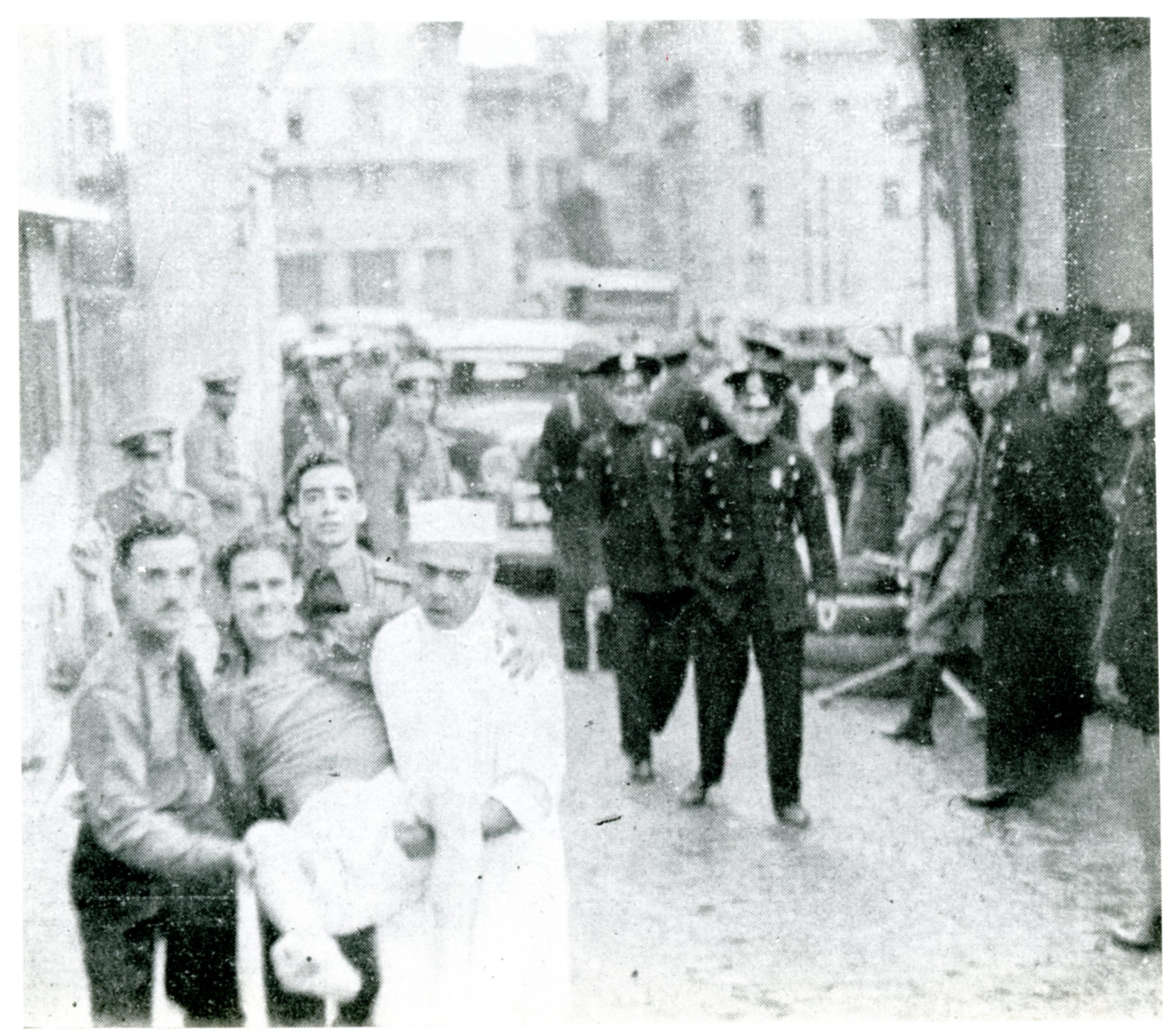
Integralist wounded during the conflict, carried by his mates.

The Integralists responded to the fire of the anti-fascists. Fulvio Abramo took advantage of the moment to start the counter-demonstration, climbing ont a column of the A Equitativa building and uttering a few words; during Abramo's speech, a hail of bullets was directed at him and the anti-fascists. Mário Pedrosa was wounded and Décio Pinto de Oliveira, a law student and Communist Youth activist, was shot in the back of the head. Benjamin Constant and Barão de Paranapiacaba were where the conflict was most intense. The anarchists fought against the Integralists and the Public Force. Gusman Soller stated in preparatory meetings the best form of organization against the Integralists would be dynamite, and Edgard Leuenroth said: "only the impediment of the fascist parade mattered". Some soldiers from the Public Force, who were influenced by João Cabanas, joined the anti-fascists,. Others took advantage of the moment to settle accounts with the newly created Federal Police, whose centralized powers took away from the state authorities the relative independence they enjoyed, which deeply irritated the paulistas.

Between 4:00 pm and 5:00 pm, there was still conflict between integralists and anti-fascists who had not yet left the square. The Integralists soon withdrew, followed Rua Senador Feijó and reached Largo São Francisco. The group that went to Largo São Francisco demanded the continuation of the rally but the police stopped them. At the end of the conflict, the integralists disbanded and abandoned their green shirts in the downtown streets of the city to avoid further aggression. According to A Plebe:

Groups of "green shirts" walked down the slopes of Porto Geral, Ouvidor, Rua Líbero, seeking refuge behind cars and in houses. Many were the ones who tore off their shirts and stayed in a sports shirt, seeing, at dusk and at night, groups of young boys, full of fear, who came from the countryside thinking they were coming to a party.

It is estimated the confrontation ended with around thirty wounded and seven dead; among them, police officers Hernani de Oliveira and José M. Rodrigues Bonfim; the integralists Jaime Guimarães, Caetano Spinelli and Teciano Bessornia; the civil guard Geraldo Cobra and the anti-fascist student Décio Pinto de Oliveira. The wounded were taken to Santa Casa hospitals.

After the conflict, the Integralists said the antifascists had been hiding on balconies of the Santa Helena buildings, watched the Integralist demonstration and opened fire as soon as a large crowd of demonstrators had gathered, and that their targets included women and children. Fúlvio Abramo and Edgard Leuenroth denied this version, stating the buildings surrounding Praça da Sé had been interdicted by police. At preparatory meetings, João Cabanas had proposed the stationing of snipers inside the buildings that surrounded the square, a proposal other militants rejected. Later, Gofredo Teles Júnior, who participated in the AIB in his youth, minimized the character of the conflict, saying in a 1990 interview with Eugênio Bucci in the magazine Teoria e Debate:

There was no confrontation. What happened was a police repression of a demonstration by workers and students. It was sad. Workers died. A police bullet hit Mário Pedrosa ... I watched everything. I was a student at the Faculty of Law. He was nineteen years old at the time ... The demonstration was of workers and students. At that time, nobody was armed ...

== Consequences ==
The Battle of Praça da Sé had a positive repercussion among the Brazilian anti-fascist movement, especially in the Federal District and, combined with the identification of the body of the young militant Tobias Warchavski, triggered a political campaign against the Vargas government's repressive policy and anti-fascist sentiment. It also drove a more-general movement against the reaction and led to the formation of a broad progressive front, which appeared with the formation of the National Liberation Alliance (Portuguese: Aliança Nacional Libertadora, ANL). After the conflict, police arrested several leftist militants. The FOSP headquarters was raided and sealed off by the authorities. The anarchists tried to reorganize the FOSP and sought ways to help militants who were imprisoned as a result of the antifascist struggle; they formed the Social Prisoners Committee, which held festive activities to raise funds to aid imprisoned comrades and their families.

In Rio de Janeiro, on October 7, the first issue of the periodical Jornal do Povo was released; it was edited by Aparício Torelly and linked to the PCB. During the week following the conflict, the newspaper devoted several reports to the episode in São Paulo, describing the event in a satirical manner and satirizing the Integralists. One of its headlines in the week following the event was "An Integralist Doesn't Run, It Flies", followed by a text, below an image of the conflict: "The integralist stampede, as you can see, was in the most perfect disorder. On the left is a green hen hidden behind the pole, and in the center several squatting. The withdrawal of the 10,000 ... Save yourself who you can! And the integralists, who like well-sounding sounding phrases, would repeat at that time, accompanied by the clatter of teeth: kill my father who is older!".

== See also ==
- 6 February 1934 crisis
- Battle of Cable Street
- Bombing of Plaza de Mayo
- Geneva fusillade of 9 November 1932
- Antifa (Brazil)

== Bibliography ==
- Abramo, Fúlvio (2014). A revoada dos galinhas verdes: Uma história do antifascismo no Brasil (in Portuguese). São Paulo: Veneta. ISBN 9788563137296. OCLC 915855025.
- Castro, Ricardo Figueiredo (2002). "A Frente Única Antifascista (FUA) e o antifascismo no Brasil (1933-1934)". Topoi (in Portuguese). 3 (5): 354–388. doi:10.1590/2237-101X0030050015. ISSN 2237-101X. OCLC 6007525793.
- Maffei, Eduardo (1984). A Batalha da Praça da Sé (in Portuguese). Rio de Janeiro: Philobiblion. OCLC 977646637.
- Rodrigues, André (2017). "Bandeiras negras contra camisas verdes: anarquismo e antifascismo nos jornais A Plebe e A Lanterna (1932-1935)". Tempos Históricos (in Portuguese). 21. Cascaval: 74–106. ISSN 1983-1463. OCLC 713557794.
- Samis, Alexandre (2004). "Pavilhão negro sobre pátria oliva: sindicalismo e anarquismo no Brasil". In Colombo, Eduardo (ed.). História do Movimento Operário Revolucionário (in Portuguese). São Paulo: Imaginário. pp. 125–189. ISBN 8576630052. OCLC 82217392.
- Samis, Alexandre (2014). "Anarquistas e sindicalistas revolucionários na luta antifascista (1933-1935)". In Vianna, Marly de Almeida; Silva, Érica Sarmiento; Gonçalves, Leandro Pereira (eds.). Presos políticos e perseguidos estrangeiros na Era Vargas (in Portuguese). Rio de Janeiro: Mauad X. pp. 25–41. ISBN 978-8574786766. OCLC 914353131.
