= Afonso Schmidt =

Brazilian writer

Afonso Frederico Schimidt
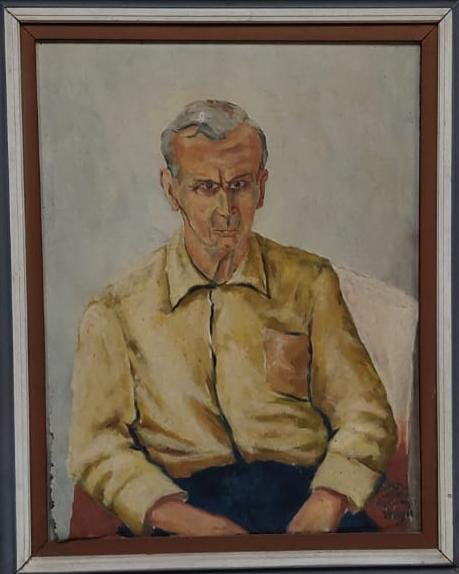
- Born: Afonso Schimidt; 29 June 1890; Cubatão, São Paulo, Brazil
- Died: 3 April 1964 (aged 73); São Paulo, São Paulo, Brazil
- Occupations: Poet, writer
- Writing career
- Notable works: O Retrato de Valentina, Zanzalá, O Tesouro de Cananeia
- Notable awards: Prêmio Machado de Assis (1942); Prêmio Juca Pato (1963)

Affonso Schmidt (29 June 1890 – 3 April 1964) was a Brazilian journalist, short story writer, novelist, and playwright.

== Biography ==
Affonso Schmidt was born on Sunday, 29 June 1890, in Cubatão.

In Cubatão, he founded the newspaper Vésper, and in the city of São Paulo he was part of the editorial staff of the important libertarian periodicals A Plebe and A Lanterna, alongside legendary figures of the Brazilian anarchist movement such as Edgard Leuenroth and Oreste Ristori. He also held positions in the editorial staff of the newspapers Folha and O Estado de S. Paulo. In the city of Rio de Janeiro, he founded the newspaper Voz do Povo, which in time became the press organ of the local Workers' Federation.

He was imprisoned several times for expressing what he thought. He also gained notoriety for the various campaigns he waged against fascism and clericalism, through pamphlets, books, plays and newspaper articles. Writing intensively throughout his life, he was the author of a vast poetic and literary work gathered in more than forty books. It includes historical chronicles, and fantasy, being also a pioneer of Brazilian science fiction.

He died on Easter Friday, 3 April 1964, in São Paulo, aged 73, around three days after the 1964 Brazilian coup d'état.

== Selected works ==
=== Poetry ===
- Lírios Roxos (1907)
- Miniaturas
- Janelas Abertas (1911)
- Mocidade (1921)
- Garoa (1932)
- Lusitania
- Poesias (1934)
- Poesia (1945)

=== Novels ===
- Brutalidade
- Os impunes
- O dragão e as virgens (fantasia)
- Pirapora
- As levianas
- Passarinho verde
- Ao relento (fantasia)
- Kellani
- A revolução brasileira (crônicas)
- A nova conflagração
- O evangelho dos livros
- Os negros
- Carne para canhão
- Curiango
- A sombra de Júlio Frank (romance)
- Colônia Cecília (romance)
- O Retrato de Valentina (1947) (romance)
- A Marcha (romance)
- O Menino Felipe (romance)
- O Tesouro de Cananeia (contos)
- A Vida de Paulo Eiró (crônicas)
- São Paulo de meus Amores (crônicas)
- Zanzalá (1938) (novela)
- A Primeira Viagem (autobiografia)

== See also ==
- Anarchism in Brazil
