= Golconda (disambiguation) =

Golconda is a ruined city and fortress in Telangana, India, fabled for its diamond mines.

Golconda may also refer to:

== Places ==
Golconda, India

- Golconda Sultanate, a former territory in Eastern Deccan, India
- Golconda Subah, a Mughal imperial top-level province in India

Others

- Golconda, Illinois, U.S.
- Golconda, Nevada, U.S.
- Golconda Skate Park, Brooklyn, New York
- Golconda, Tasmania, Australia
- Golconda, Trinidad and Tobago, a town in Trinidad and Tobago

== Other uses ==
- Golconda (Magritte), a 1953 painting by René Magritte
- Golconda diamonds, mined near former Golconda Sultanate, India
- List of ships named Golconda
- Golconda Abbulu, a 1982 Indian Telugu-language film by Dasari Narayana Rao
- Golconda, a status in the game Vampire: The Masquerade
- The Queen of Golconda, 1863 Swedish-language opera by Franz Berwald

== See also ==
- La Gioconda (disambiguation)
