= Antifascist United Front (Brazil) =

Frente Única Antifascista (United Antifascist Front)
- Abbreviation: FUA
- Formation: June 25, 1933
- Type: Broad front of democratic, progressive and left-wing parties and organizations
- Purpose: To combat fascism, represented in Brazil by the Brazilian Integralist Action (AIB)
- Location: São Paulo, Brazil
- Members: Liga Comunista (LC, Communist League), Partido Socialista Brasileiro (PSB, Brazilian Socialist Party) and other minor left-wing organizations; occasional articulation with anarchists and the Communist Party of Brazil (PCB)
- Francesco Frola: President

The Frente Única Antifascista (FUA; United Antifascist Front) was a political organization founded on June 25, 1933, in the city of São Paulo to combat fascism, represented in Brazil by the Brazilian Integralist Action (AIB). The FUA was created on the initiative of militants from the Liga Comunista (LC, Communist League), the Partido Socialista Brasileiro (PSB, Brazilian Socialist Party), antifascist Italian immigrants and other minor left-wing organizations. Two important segments of the São Paulo left at the time, the anarchists and militants of the Communist Party of Brazil (PCB), did not formally participate in the FUA but maintained contacts and coordinated with the front on some occasions.

The FUA, articulating with other sectors of the left, held a series of antifascist rallies and demonstrations, and its militants played an important role in the Battle of Praça da Sé. Until February 1934, the year the organization ceased its activities, the FUA published the newspaper O Homem Livre (The Free Man), considered the main antifascist propaganda vehicle of that period.

Throughout 1934, with the advance of fascism in Europe and the reformulation of the policies of the Communist International (Comintern), which pointed towards the formation of popular fronts, the FUA opened space for the formation of a broader front of progressive sectors, diluting the antifascist struggle in the more general struggle for reforms and against conservative forces. This process culminated in the formation of the Aliança Nacional Libertadora (ANL, National Liberating Alliance) in 1935.

== Context ==
The FUA was founded at a time when political radicalization, on both the left and the right, was evident in Brazil and the rest of the world. In the 1930s, liberalism was undergoing a crisis due to events such as the Wall Street Crash of 1929, the growth of fascist movements in Europe and the radicalization of communist movements. Liberalism then began to face significant competition from other proposals for economic and political organization, from both the right and the left, which eventually marginalized it from the national political-ideological debate, in a context where the functioning of the National Constituent Assembly (between 1933 and 1934) resulted in great agitation and turbulence within Brazilian civil society. The ideological and political crisis of liberalism in Brazil became a political issue not only for the elites, who throughout the 1930s debated a viable alternative to liberalism. The middle classes and workers also participated in the debate, either from the right, with fascism, or from the left, with socialism, communism and anarchism. The debate on alternatives to liberalism in practice competed with the confrontation between fascism and antifascism.

== Background ==
Fascism and antifascism had been confronting each other in Brazil since the 1920s. However, it was only after the founding of the Brazilian Integralist Action (AIB) in October 1932 that the dispute gained more prominence among national political themes. Italian antifascists played an important role in the antifascist struggle in Brazil in the 1920s. From 1933 onwards, they began to face competition from Brazilian antifascists, especially the Trotskyists of the Liga Comunista (LC, Communist League) and the socialists of the São Paulo Partido Socialista Brasileiro (PSB, Brazilian Socialist Party), with whom some of them allied, led by the Italian socialist Francesco Frola, who became the link between the two generations of antifascist militancy.

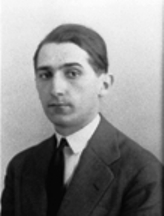
Mário Pedrosa was one of the most prominent militants of the Communist League and played an important role in articulating the United Antifascist Front.

In January 1933, with the rise to power of the Nazis in Germany, left-wing organizations began to show greater concern in articulating a united front of an antifascist character. Still that month, the Trotskyist leader Mário Pedrosa gave an interview to the São Paulo daily A Platea, in which he discussed the World Congress Against Imperialist War held in Amsterdam, on the initiative of writers Henri Barbusse and Romain Rolland in late 1932, and the role of the Brazilian Left Opposition in this matter. That month, the Executive Commission of the LC approved the decision "to fight for the formation of a united antifascist front in São Paulo"; still in January, on the 20th, the newspaper A Platea reported that the Executive Commission of the União dos Trabalhadores Gráficos (UTG, Union of Graphic Workers) of São Paulo, then dominated by the Trotskyists, approved the decision to address "all trade union organizations in São Paulo, proposing a united front".

From February onwards, militants of the Communist Party of Brazil (PCB) and the LC participated in meetings and conferences in São Paulo where the creation of an organization inspired by the World Congress Against Imperialist War was discussed. On the 7th of that month, a meeting took place at the UTG headquarters in São Paulo, which included representatives from various class associations, which ended up calling, for February 9, a rally at Largo São José do Belém, which originated the Anti-War Committee, in which the PCB would participate and lead. At the time, the Trotskyists still considered themselves members, albeit expelled, of the PCB and therefore acted so that the PCB would create the Committee according to their particular guidelines. The Anti-War Committee would be affiliated with the World Committee Against War and Fascism.

On March 23, the Integralists, led by Plínio Salgado, marched for the first time in the city of São Paulo, causing the antifascists to accelerate their actions. In May, militants from the LC and the São Paulo PSB founded the periodical O Homem Livre (The Free Man), which would become one of the main antifascist propaganda organs and the spokesperson for the FUA after its foundation. On June 11, during a ceremony commemorating the assassination of the Italian socialist deputy Giacomo Matteotti, the Trotskyist Aristides Lobo proposed the formation of a united antifascist front.

== Founding ==
One week after the ceremony honoring Matteotti, on June 25, a meeting was held in the hall of the União Cívica 5 de Julho (Civic Union of July 5), at which the Frente Única Antifascista (United Antifascist Front) was constituted. The meeting was chaired by Francesco Frola and was attended by organizations such as the São Paulo PSB, the Liga Comunista (LC, Communist League), the União dos Trabalhadores Gráficos (UTG, Union of Graphic Workers), the Grêmio Universitário Socialista (Socialist University Guild), the Legião Cívica 5 de Julho (Civic Legion of July 5), the Bandeira dos 18 (Flag of the 18), the Gruppo Socialista Giacomo Matteotti (Giacomo Matteotti Socialist Group), the newspaper O Homem Livre (The Free Man), the newspaper A Rua (The Street), the magazine O Socialismo (Socialism), the Gruppo Italia Libera (Free Italy Group), the Federação Operária de São Paulo (FOSP, São Paulo Workers' Federation) and the anarchist newspapers A Lanterna (The Lantern) and A Plebe (The Plebs). The PCB and organizations linked to it were invited but did not attend. Later, the FUA would receive the membership of the União dos Profissionais do Volante (Union of Driving Professionals) and the socialist periodical O Brasil Novo (The New Brazil). The anarchists organized around the FOSP and its periodicals chose not to join the FUA, organizing their own Antifascist Committee. During the meeting, the libertarians defended a struggle front that would be formed through the union of all antifascist individuals and, "on the bases of the broadest and most complete autonomy of the factions, principles and doctrines that subdivide men into clubs, legions, parties and dissent". However, the other groups that joined the FUA were supporters of forming a united front that would bring together the various left-wing parties and unions, rather than one formed from antifascist individuals, which was seen by the anarchists as an incongruity, given that a good part of these organizations were very insignificant. The PCB, which followed the political positions adopted by the Communist International (Comintern) at the time, refused to participate in any front organization, disregarding the other left-wing political currents. (Note: Between 1929 and 1934, the Communist International formulated the theory of the "Third Period", which considered that capitalism was undergoing a structural crisis that would trigger an imminent imperialist war. The workers' movement should fight so that this capitalist crisis would not turn into an imperialist war against the Soviet Union, but into a revolutionary civil war, and should also avoid the co-opting action of social democracy, so that communists should not integrate any broad front with other left-wing organizations.) However, at times, especially in late 1933, the São Paulo regional committee of the PCB participated in front activities, as did the anarchists, who also maintained contacts and sometimes coordinated with the FUA.

== Activities ==
In the early days of July, the group leading the FUA met at the São Paulo PSB headquarters to deal with the ratification of the bases for the organization's constitution and to schedule a rally commemorating the fall of the Bastille, on July 14. The rally was held at the Lega Lombarda headquarters and chaired by Aristides Lobo. On that occasion, the "Manifesto of the United Antifascist Front" was launched, and the podium was successively occupied by representatives of the organizations and periodicals O Brasil Novo, Frente Negra Socialista (Black Socialist Front), União Sindical dos Profissionais do Volante (Union of Driving Professionals), Italia Libera, O Homem Livre, União dos Trabalhadores Gráficos (Union of Graphic Workers), Bandeira dos 18, Liga Comunista (Communist League), and other groups and parties that sent delegates, including the International Red Aid (Socorro Vermelho), the PCB, the FOSP, a railway worker from Sorocabana, and Oreste Ristori. The meeting, which started at 8 pm, lasted until after 11 pm. After this episode, the FUA entered a period of inactivity that lasted until September, when O Homem Livre called on the organizations that participated in its founding to fulfill their role. This inactivity was mainly caused by a crisis within the São Paulo PSB, which sought an identity that differentiated it from the left-wing tendencies of tenentismo. (Note: On October 4, the São Paulo PSB elected a new Central Directory, overcoming the phase of organic instability and political uncertainty, adopting a professedly Marxist program.)

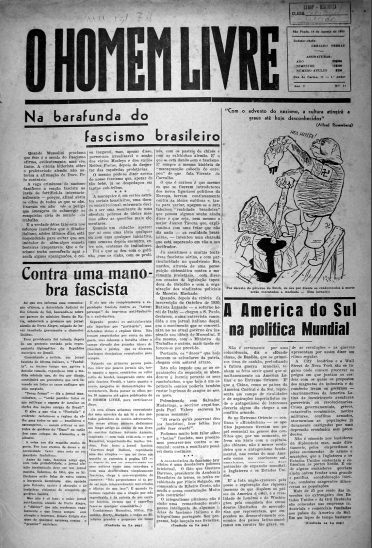
Edition of O Homem Livre from August 14, 1933. The newspaper became the press organ of the FUA after its creation and was the main antifascist propaganda vehicle of the period.

The FUA had in the newspaper O Homem Livre the definition of its political identity in relation to São Paulo civil society and, particularly, in opposition to fascism, represented by the AIB. Founded about a month before the creation of the FUA, the newspaper was conceived and created by journalists from the São Paulo evening paper Diário da Noite. The first edition of the newspaper is dated May 27, 1933, and featured articles, signed or under pseudonyms, by José Pérez, Mário Pedrosa, Lívio Xavier, Aristides Lobo, Goffredo Rosini, Geraldo Ferraz and Miguel Macedo, and was illustrated by the engraver Lívio Abramo. With the founding of the FUA on July 25, O Homem Livre became its press organ and the main antifascist propaganda periodical of the São Paulo left. The campaign to demystify fascism carried out in the pages of O Homem Livre used humor as one of its main strategies, through the publication of cartoons originally published in foreign newspapers, such as the Daily Express and The Nation, and several articles were published that sought to analyze fascism and Integralism satirically. The periodical also sought to denounce fascist practices and the means by which fascism used to obtain certain results, as in the article "The Anti-Semitic Exploitations of the Protocols of the Elders of Zion" ("As Explorações Anti-Semitas Sobre os Protocolos dos Sábios de Sião"), by José Pérez, also published in the first edition of the newspaper, which demonstrated the racist nature of Nazism.

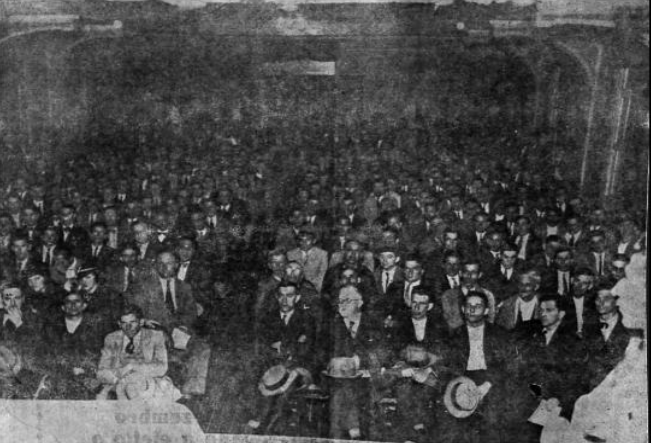
Anti-Integralist conference held on November 14, 1933, in the hall of the União das Classes Laboriousas.

In September 1933, the São Paulo Regional Committee of the PCB, through Hermínio Sacchetta, initiated conversations with the FUA and, while criticizing the Trotskyists, agreed to sign a manifesto calling on antifascists to participate in an anti-Integralist conference scheduled for November 14, 1933. The conference, organized by the anarchists through the Centro de Cultura Social (CCS, Center for Social Culture), included the participation of representatives from various left-wing political currents, such as the socialist Carmelo Crispino, the anarchist Hermínio Marcos and a representative of the newspaper O Homem Livre. The event, held in the hall of the União das Classes Laboriousas (Union of the Working Classes), brought together around a thousand people. In the middle of the conference, some Integralists appeared to disrupt it, however, upon realizing the number of antifascist elements present there, they withdrew and began to look for reinforcements in the vicinity, being repelled by a group of workers.

With the aggravation of conflicts between Integralists and antifascists, reports of aggression by Integralists against left-wing militants emerged in various parts of the country, leading the FUA to decide to organize a counter-demonstration for December 15, 1933, the date on which the AIB had scheduled an Integralist rally. The announcement by the FUA that there would be a counter-demonstration led the AIB to cancel the march. The FUA rally, however, took place at the Lega Lombarda headquarters with the presence of around two thousand participants, including militants from the PCB and the Anti-War Committee. At this event, the FUA demonstrated intentions to coordinate with other antifascist organizations from other states for the formation of a National United Antifascist Front, in addition to having called on the São Paulo workers' movement for the formation of a trade union front.

Despite the success of these two events, the PCB and the Anti-War Committee tried to position themselves as the guides of the front, thus emptying the FUA's leading role. In the meantime, the Central Committee of the PCB, located in Rio de Janeiro, intervened in the São Paulo Regional Committee, given that the PCB's participation in the FUA contradicted the party's and the Comintern's political line of "united front from below". (Note: As explained, the policy of the Communist International did not allow communists to join broad fronts with other left-wing parties and organizations, but defended a united front with militants from other political groups, provided they were under the tutelage of the Communist Party. This policy became known as the "united front from below".)

After this, the FUA called a rally for January 25, the anniversary of the city of São Paulo. The event was prevented by the police, and a commission from the PSB went to the Military Region to try to obtain last-minute authorization. Before its return, a PCB militant tried to open the rally, unsuccessfully. Even so, some leaders made short speeches that were interrupted by the mounted police. On the night of the following day, the police invaded the UGT headquarters during a conference by Francesco Frola, arresting everyone present. On this occasion, pressured by the Central Committee, the São Paulo Regional Committee of the PCB abandoned the FUA and began a violent campaign against it. The PCB had already tried to position itself as the guide of the front while participating in the activities promoted by it, and after the rupture, the São Paulo newspaper A Vanguarda Estudantil (The Student Vanguard), linked to the PCB, began publishing harsh criticisms of the FUA, calling it a "deceptive united front" that aimed to overshadow the legitimate united front of the Anti-War Committee, promoted by the PCB since early 1933.

On February 24, 1934, the last issue of O Homem Livre was published. The closure of the FUA's newspaper demonstrated the political and financial difficulties it was going through. The problems faced by the PSB, the organic fragility of the Trotskyists, the refusal of the anarchists to participate in the FUA more consistently, and the PCB's decision to stop collaborating with the front contributed to making the continuation of the newspaper unfeasible and hindered the continuation of the FUA's activities. Throughout 1934, the Trotskyists, now organized in the Liga Comunista Internacionalista (LCI, Internationalist Communist League) (Note: On October 1, the II National (Extraordinary) Conference of the Communist League took place, in which it endorsed the proposal of Trotsky and the Left Opposition to found a Fourth International. The International Left Opposition no longer considered it possible to reform the Comintern and its national sections, and called on its followers to found a new international communist organization. In practice, the LC ceased to consider itself the left opposition of the PCB and began to see itself as an autonomous organization, now called the Internationalist Communist League (LCI).) and the militants of the São Paulo PSB began to dedicate themselves to building a united trade union and electoral leftist front. In this sense, they held a rally on May 1, held in the courtyard of the Palácio das Indústrias (Palace of Industries), in Parque D. Pedro II (Dom Pedro II Park). The PCB did not participate in this rally, where representatives from the LCI, PSB, Sindicatos Profissionais do Volante (Union of Driving Professionals), dos Tecelões (Weavers), dos Barbeiros e Cabeleireiros (Barbers and Hairdressers), dos Empregados em Hotéis (Hotel Employees), independent groups from the Sindicato dos Rodoviários (Road Workers' Union), Sindicato dos Empregados em Comércio (Commerce Employees' Union), União dos Trabalhadores Gráficos (Union of Graphic Workers) and Sindicato dos Bancários (Bank Workers' Union) spoke.

The second half of 1934 was characterized by direct confrontation between antifascists and the AIB and by the search for the political articulation of the unity of left-wing forces, in the trade union, electoral and anti-fascist fields. Political radicalization could be perceived since April, when on the 20th, thirteen days after the start of the Constitution's voting, the first of a series of Integralist parades took place in important Brazilian cities, demonstrating the organizational and political strengthening of the AIB. On this day, around 4,000 people paraded through the streets of Rio de Janeiro. About a month later, on June 24, an Integralist parade took place in the capital of São Paulo, with around 3,000 people. A week later, on July 2, a holiday in Bahia, around 400 Integralists paraded through the streets of Salvador. On the other hand, on July 9, in Niterói, the I National Conference of the PCB ended, which, among other things, institutionalized a new leading group and marked a radicalization in the party's policies, which refused to participate in any electoral coalition and led a series of increasingly violent strikes and demonstrations.

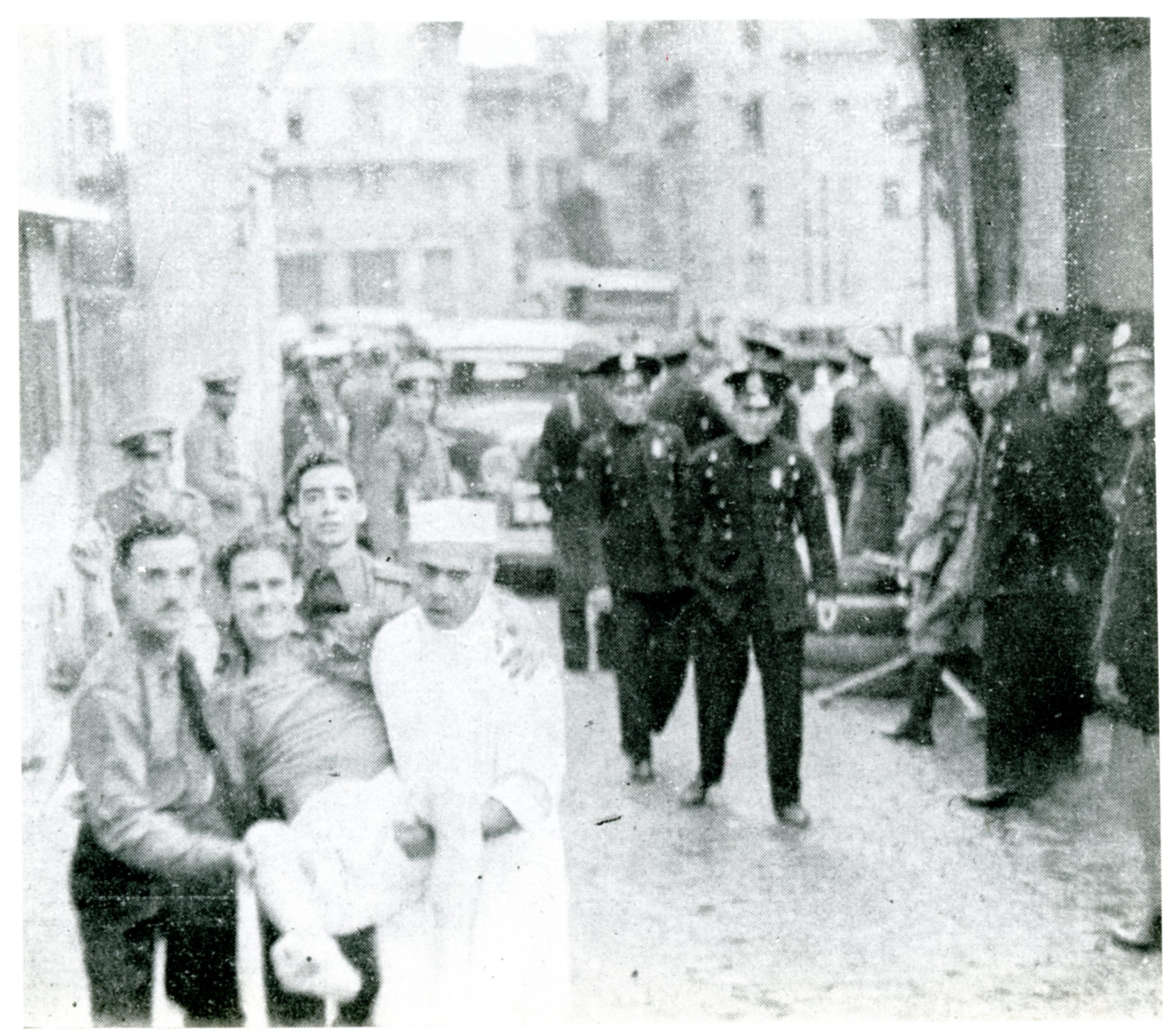
Injured Integralist during the Battle of Praça da Sé, carried by companions.

In October 1934, finally, the dispute between the left and the AIB reached direct confrontation in an open public space. On the 3rd, a Wednesday, a confrontation between Integralists and left-wing militants in Bauru, in the interior of São Paulo, resulted in one death — Nicola Rosica — and four injured, all Integralists. One of the main accused of participating in the aggression against the Integralists was a candidate for state deputy for the Coligação das Esquerdas (Leftist Coalition), created in São Paulo by the Coligação dos Sindicatos Proletários (Coalition of Proletarian Unions), LCI and PSB at the end of August. Four days later, on Sunday, the confrontation reached a larger dimension, taking place in the commercial and financial center of the capital of São Paulo. For that day, October 7, the AIB called its militants for a political event to be held at Praça da Sé, where the second anniversary of the "Integralist Manifesto" would be celebrated. According to Fúlvio Abramo, (Note: There are divergences between the sources. Fúlvio Abramo links the antifascist counter-demonstration directly to the FUA's performance; Eduardo Maffei tries to dilute the FUA's role and attributes the calling of the counter-demonstration to the work of the PCB. Mário Pedrosa, in turn, stated that "no organization or party can claim the merit of having achieved that formidable mobilization of workers alone".) the Trotskyists, as soon as they learned of the AIB's intentions to hold such a demonstration, decided to prevent it. They called upon the organizations that had participated in the FUA until the May 1st rally to prepare a counter-demonstration. Its secretariat, then recreated, formed by members of the LCI and the PSB, contacted the PCB and the anarchists. A series of manifestos were published calling on antifascist militants and sympathizers to attend the event. Although without fully centralized direction, all antifascist forces participated together in the counter-demonstration, which resulted in a violent conflict that became known as the "Battle of Praça da Sé". The conflict resulted in the deaths of two police officers, one civil guard, three Integralists and one antifascist student – Décio Pinto de Oliveira –, ending with the general rout of the Integralists, who abandoned their green shirts in the streets of downtown São Paulo to avoid further aggression.

== Political developments of the FUA ==
The Battle of Praça da Sé had great positive repercussions in Rio de Janeiro, and combined with the identification of the body of the young militant Tobias Warchavski, it triggered a political campaign against the repressive policy of the government of Getúlio Vargas that combined with the antifascist sentiment. Throughout 1934, with the advance of fascism in Europe, the Communist International reformulated its policies, signaling that the union of communists with other progressive political forces would be possible, pointing towards the formation of popular fronts. The political process that accelerated in the last weeks of 1934 was moving towards the formation of a much broader front than the FUA and the Anti-War Committee, with the formation of a United Front of Struggle against Reaction and Fascism (Frente Única de Luta contra a Reação e o Fascismo), of an electoral nature, formed by the Partido Socialista Proletário do Brasil (Proletarian Socialist Party of Brazil), the Internationalist Communist League, the Partido Trabalhista Brasileiro (Brazilian Labor Party) and the Communist Party. The United Front of Struggle against Reaction and Fascism did not elect any candidate, but it contributed to the formation of a broad coalition of progressive sectors favorable to more comprehensive reforms in society, forming a popular front that diluted the antifascist struggle in the struggle for reforms and against conservative forces. This process would culminate, in 1935, in the formation of the Aliança Nacional Libertadora (ANL, National Liberating Alliance).

== Bibliography ==
- Abramo, Fúlvio (2014). A revoada dos galinhas verdes: Uma história do antifascismo no Brasil [The Flight of the Green Chickens: A History of Antifascism in Brazil]. São Paulo: Veneta.
- Castro, Ricardo Figueiredo (2002). "A Frente Única Antifascista (FUA) e o antifascismo no Brasil (1933-1934)" [The United Antifascist Front (FUA) and Antifascism in Brazil (1933-1934)]. Topoi. 3 (5): 354–388.
- Castro, Ricardo Figueiredo (2005). "O Homem Livre: um jornal a serviço da liberdade (1933-1934)" [O Homem Livre (The Free Man): A Newspaper at the Service of Liberty (1933-1934)]. Cadernos AEL. 1 (22/23): 59–77.
- Rodrigues, André (2017). "Bandeiras negras contra camisas verdes: anarquismo e antifascismo nos jornais A Plebe e A Lanterna (1932-1935)" [Black Flags Against Green Shirts: Anarchism and Antifascism in the Newspapers A Plebe and A Lanterna (1932-1935)]. Tempos Históricos. 21: 74–106.
