= Brazilian science fiction =

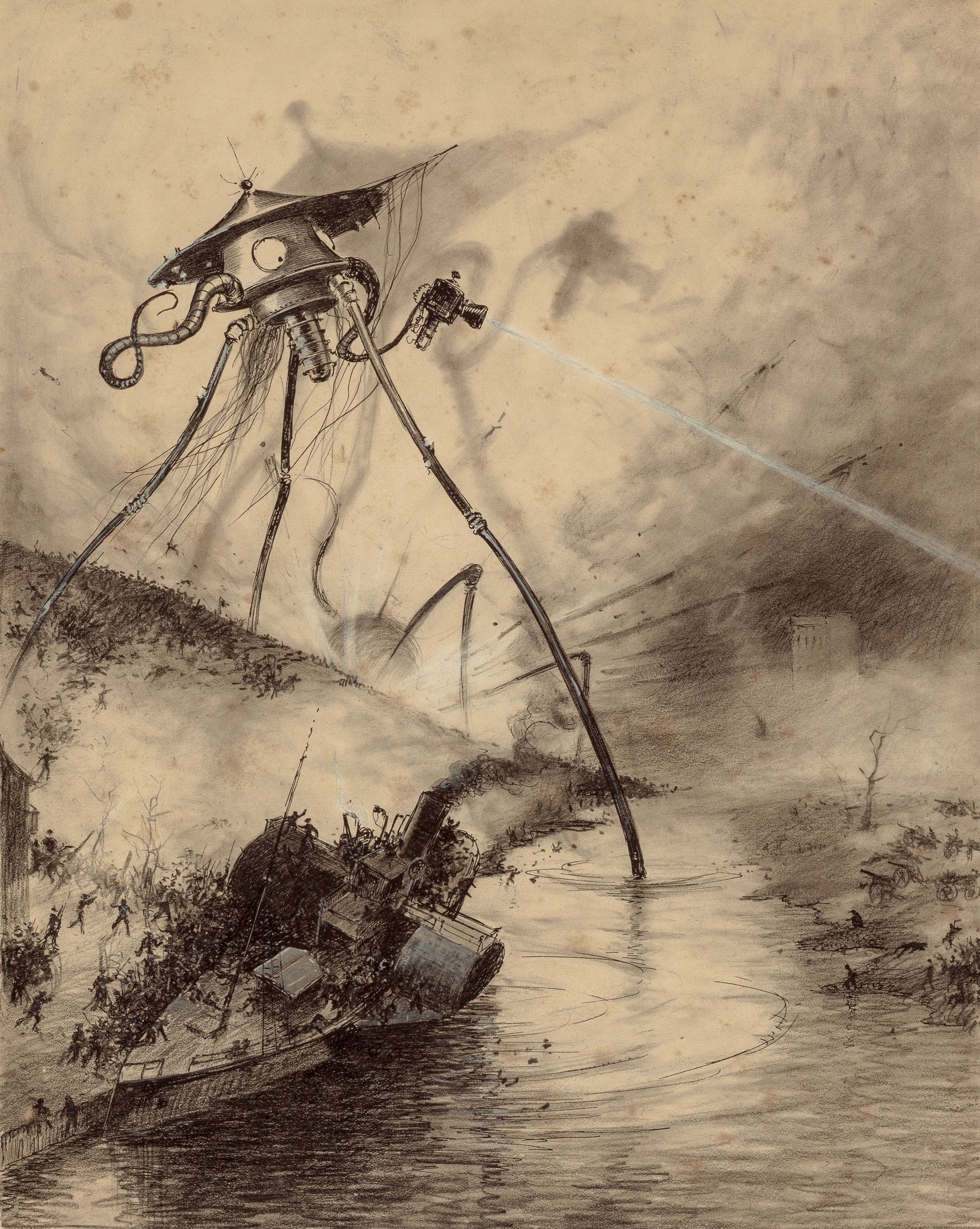
Tripod: drawing by Brazilian illustrator Henrique Alvim for the Belgian 1906 edition of The War of the Worlds of H. G. Wells

Brazilian science fiction has been a part of Brazilian literature since the mid 19th century. The first works of Brazilian Science Fiction emerged in the decades following Brazil's independence. Brazilian science fiction has its roots in authors such as Augusto Emílio Zaluar in the novel O Doutor Benignus and Machado de Assis in the short story O Imortal (1882). The genre grew in popularity over the 20th century, reaching its first “golden age” in the late 1950s, bolstered by the work of publisher Gumercindo Rocha Dorea. Following the end of the military dictatorship in 1985, the genre has witnessed a renaissance, with an influx of new writers and diverse influences reshaping the genre.

== 19th century and early works ==
The first examples of Brazilian science fiction literature were written in the decades following Brazil's independence. At the time, the literary culture in Brazil stemmed from a small group of elites, as a large majority of the population was still illiterate. The upper class were significantly outward looking, holding themselves in the same esteem as European society. Brazilian science fiction emerged in the latter half of the 19th century, roughly parallel with the burgeoning popularity of Science Fiction in France, particularly the work of Jules Verne, who is widely considered to be the progenitor of science fiction literature. The new cadre of Brazilian writers began incorporating science fiction motifs, like imaginary societies studied with scientific rigor, and futuristic voyages. While admittedly derivative of the scientific romance story models of European science fiction, the works were often based around the specific geographical and social landscape of 19th century Brazil.

Emílio Zaluar, a naturalized Brazilian citizen born in Portugal, wrote one of the country's principal science fiction texts, O Doutor Benignus (en: Dr. Benignus), in 1875. O Doutor Benignus is pointed to as being the first fully realized Brazilian science fiction text. Zaluar kept abreast of scientific discovery and read numerous scientific publications in order to realize his work, which mapped current scientific consensus to a narrative, in the tradition of Jules Verne. The book references Verne by name, as well as Camille Flammarion, whose writing about extraterrestrial life manifests itself in the text. Creating science fiction narratives that intertwined with the framework of Brazil's developing national identity of “Grandeza”, or greatness, is a hallmark of Brazilian science fiction. There is a utopian undercurrent that runs through the work; namely that science will enhance the bountiful natural endowments that Brazil has, and will allow Brazil to achieve its vision of becoming a world power equal to those in Europe.

Some other notable proto-FC (proto-ficção científica) works include: O Fim do Mundo (en: The End of the World) by Joaquim Manuel de Macedo (1857); Páginas da história do Brasil, escritas no ano 2000 (en: Pages of history of Brazil, written in the year 2000) by Joaquim Felício dos Santos (published 1868-1872 in O Jequitinhonha); O Imortal (en: The Immortal) by Marchado de Assis (1882); and A Rainha do Ignoto (en: The Queen of the Unknown) by Emília Freitas (1899).

== 20th century ==
Between January and October 1907, the children's magazine O Tico-Tico published the novel Viagens maravilhosas do Dr. Alpha ao mundo dos planetas, written and illustrated by Oswaldo Silva, possibly the first space travel story in Brazilian literature.

As Brazil entered the 20th century, more utopian strains of speculative fiction emerged, as well as developing latent elements of social criticism. The scientifically inclined lost world model of speculative fiction was still popular within Brazil. As a notable example, Gastão Cruls' A Amazônia Misteriosa from 1925 was based around the discovery of a secluded tribe deep within the Amazon, being experimented on by a German scientist. The novel drew heavily from H. G. Wells’ The Island of Doctor Moreau, but used the premise as a way to explore and criticize neo-colonial attitudes. Adalzira Bittencourt's Sua Excia. a presidente da República (en: Her Excellency, the president of the Republic) (1929) also explores these themes, with a utopian tone overlying a sinister, eugenicist society.

The genre started to become more refined in the mid-20th century. Afonso Schmidt's 1949 publication of Zanzalá (which had been in progress since 1928) is considered a foundational work, being honored in the journal Zanzalá – Revista Brasileira de Estudos sobre Gêneros Cinematográficos e Audiovisuais (en: Zanzalá - Brazilian Journal on Studies of Cinematographic and Audiovisual Genres). Érico Verissimo, inspired by the earlier de Assis, published several pioneering works, such as As Aventuras de Tibicuera (en: The Adventures of Tibicuera) in 1937 and Viagem à Aurora do Mundo (en: Journey to the Dawn of the World) in 1939.

H. G. Wells’ influence loomed large over Brazilian writers in the first half of the 20th century, as Jules Verne had in the latter half of the 19th century. His influence can be seen in the work of both novelists and the serialized pulp writers. While there were important novels published during this era, the majority of science fiction published up until the 1960s appeared in cheap pulp magazines. The work was often formulaic and drew heavily from the cliches of American pulp fiction. Authors such as Rubens Francisco Lucchetti were emblematic of the era; Lucchetti was hugely prolific and published more than 1500 pulp stories under a number of pseudonyms over the course of his career.

The “First Wave” of Brazilian science fiction began in earnest in the late 1950s, owing in large part to the towering influence of the publisher Gumercindo Rocha Dorea. Dorea brought a newfound respectability to Science Fiction, courting respected authors with a reputation for writing outside the science fiction genre. Edições GRD published authors who had already established themselves within the literary culture such as Diná Silveira de Queirós and Antônio Olinto - both of whom were elected to the Brazilian Academy of Letters - as well as existing participants in the nascent Science Fiction scene such as Fausto Fernandes da Cunha, who was a literary critic at the time. Dorea published two influential collections of short stories in 1961, the first of their kind: “Histórias do Acontecerá” and the authoritatively titled “Antologia Brasileira de Ficção-científica”. These writers were the forefront of Science Fiction in Brazil and spawned new interest in the genre. They were subsequently referred to as the “GRD Generation” by Cunha and others.

The Military dictatorship in Brazil which began in April 1964 interrupted and affected almost every facet of the country, including literary production. The new regime came with limits on freedom of speech and political expression, and Authors had to react accordingly. There was a contingent of mainstream authors who turned to the genre to use Science Fiction as a forum to express criticism of the new regime and its restrictive and authoritarian nature. By encoding social criticism within the tropes of Science Fiction, it gave authors a forum to voice their otherwise inexpressible political dissent.

== Post-Dictatorship Science Fiction ==
Following the democratization of Brazil and the end of the military regime in March 1985, Brazilian science fiction rebounded as the genre grew in size and scope. The “Second Wave” of Brazilian science fiction began in the mid-1980s. The publication of Jorge Luiz Calife's Padrões de Contato in 1985 was a touchstone text for the new generation of Science Fiction authors, and constitutes Brazil's first foray into hard science fiction. Calife's background as a science journalist bolstered his understanding of the phenomena that underpins his scientifically accurate and logical writing, which has inspired other Brazilian writers of hard science fiction such as Gerson Lodi-Ribeiro, and even garnered plaudits from Arthur C. Clarke, one of the foremost writers of hard science fiction.

The early 1990s saw the ascent of the Tupinipunk genre. Tupinipunk drew from the aesthetics of cyberpunk, such as cyborg augmentation and body modification, increasing rates of societal control through technology, and an alien, technology-dominated existence. It sought to funnel these elements into an interrogation of Brazilian identity, drawing from indigenous traditions and the country's history. Similarly to Cyberpunk, it also speaks to current anxieties about the increasing role of technology in Brazil's newly neoliberal society.

== Brazilian Science Fiction in the 21st Century ==
Contemporary authors continue to contribute to the genre through novels and short stories. Their work is still sometimes published through established publishers, but is increasingly being distributed online; whether through web fiction, or through self-publishing ebooks.

== Recommended reading ==
- De Sousa Causo, Roberto. 2003. Ficção científica, fantasia e horror no Brasil, 1875 a 1950. Editora UFMG
- Ginway, M. Elizabeth .2004. Brazilian Science Fiction: Cultural Myths and Nationhood in the Land of the Future. Bucknell University Press
