= Joconde =

Joconde may refer to:

- Joconde sponge cake, a type of sponge cake
- Joconde (database), a French national database of museum collections
- Joconde, a 1665 tale by Jean de La Fontaine
- Joconde, a 1795 comedy by François-Pierre-Auguste Léger
- Joconde, an 1814 opera by Nicolas Isouard
- The Joconde or La Joconde, the French name of the Mona Lisa, a portrait painting by Leonardo da Vinci

== See also ==
- Gioconda (disambiguation)
- Giocondo (disambiguation)
- Jucundus (disambiguation)
