= Maria Lacerda de Moura =

Brazilian anarcho-feminist journalist (1887–1945)

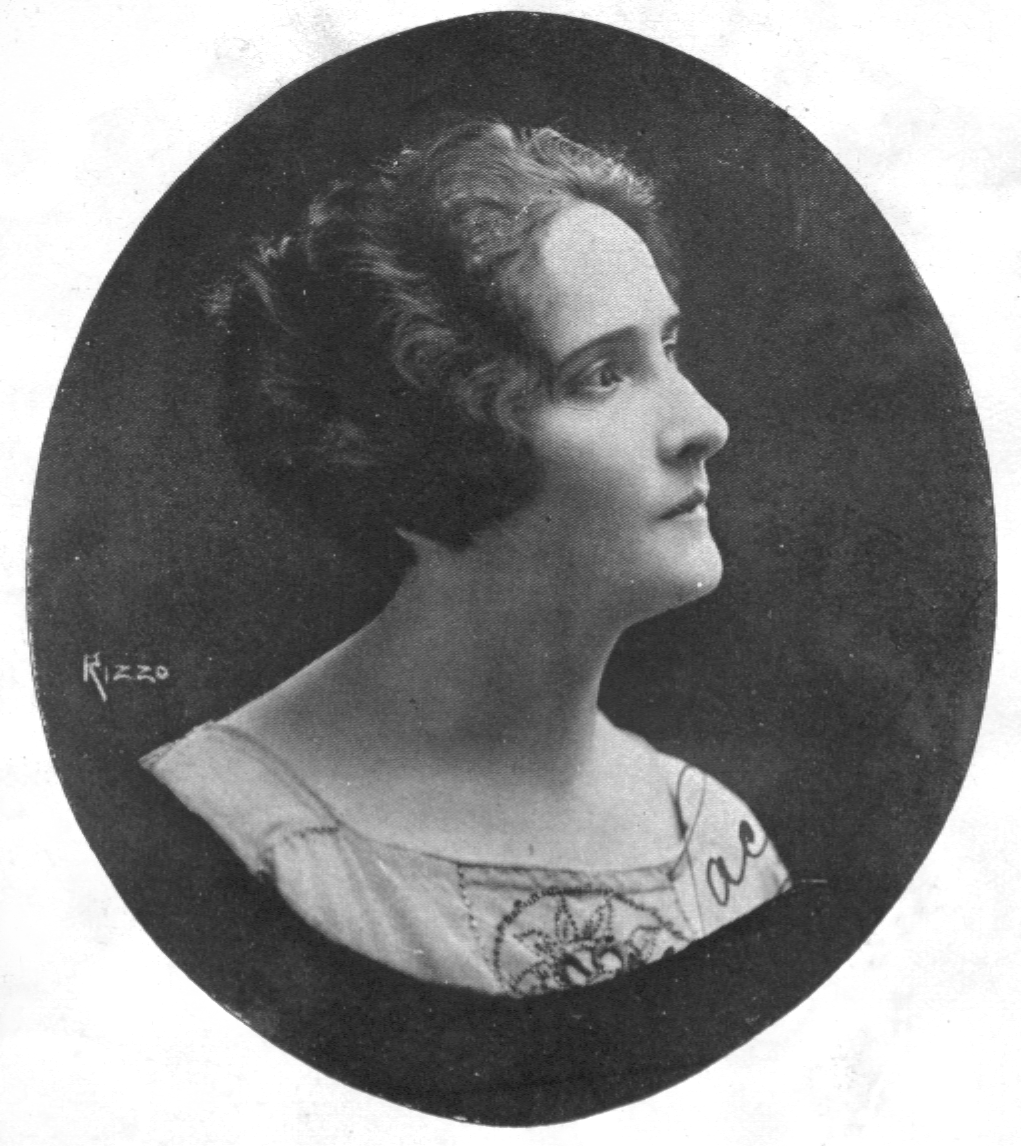
- Portrait by Gioconda Rizzo, 1926

President of the International Women's Federation
- In office 1921–1922

Personal details
- Born: 16 May 1887 Manhuaçu, Brazil
- Died: 20 March 1945 (aged 57) Rio de Janeiro, Brazil
- Resting place: Cemitério de São João Batista
- Spouse: Carlos Ferreira de Moura (1905-1925)
- Domestic partner: André Néblind (1926-1937)
- Education: Escola Normal Municipal de Barbacena
- Occupation: Teacher, writer
- Known for: Individualist anarchism, feminism, anti-fascism

Maria Lacerda de Moura (Portuguese pronunciation: [maˈɾiɐ laˈsɛʁdɐ dʒi ˈmowɾɐ]; 16 May 1887 – 20 March 1945) was a Brazilian teacher, writer and anarcha-feminist. The daughter of spiritist and anti-clerical parents, she grew up in the city of Barbacena, in the interior of Minas Gerais, where she graduated as a teacher at the Escola Normal Municipal de Barbacena and participated in official efforts to tackle social inequality through national literacy campaigns and educational reforms.

She began to publish crônicas in a local newspaper in 1912 and in 1918 she published her first book, Em torno da educação, made up of crônicas and conferences she gave in Barbacena on the subject of education. From then on, she established contacts with journalists and writers from Belo Horizonte, São Paulo and Rio de Janeiro. During this period, she met José Oiticica and adopted the progressive education methods of Maria Montessori and Francesc Ferrer. She moved to São Paulo in 1921, at the age of 34, and there she had contacts with the feminist movement and the labor movement of the time. She even collaborated with the feminist Bertha Lutz and presided over the International Women's Federation. In 1922, she broke with the women's associations, which were fundamentally concerned with women's suffrage, because she considered that the fight for the right to vote answered a very limited part of women's needs. She collaborated assiduously with the labor and progressive press in São Paulo and in 1923 launched the magazine Renascença.

Between 1928 and 1937, she lived in a farming community in Guararema, in the interior of São Paulo, formed by individualist anarchists and Spanish, French, and Italian deserters from World War I. It was the period of her life in which she produced and acted the most, collaborating weekly in the newspaper O Combate, where she established the polemic of greatest impact with the local fascist press; she gave conferences in Uruguay and Argentina, invited by anti-fascist educational institutions; she met Luís Carlos Prestes, in exile in Buenos Aires; she gave pacifist conferences and triggered the anti-fascist campaign in São Paulo. The Guararema community was disbanded with political repression during the Estado Novo. In 1938, Maria Lacerda moved to Rio de Janeiro, where she worked at Rádio Mayrink Veiga reading horoscopes. She died on 20 March 1945.

Considered one of the pioneers of feminism in Brazil, her work dealt with subjects such as the condition of women, free love, the right to sexual pleasure, divorce, conscientious motherhood, prostitution, the fight against clericalism, fascism, and militarism, and established a link between the problem of women's emancipation and the struggle for the emancipation of the individual from capitalism. Her positions share many similar aspects with those of later second-wave feminists.

== Biography ==
=== Early years ===
In 1887, Maria Lacerda de Moura was born in Manhuaçu, in the province of Minas Gerais. In 1891, when she was 4 years old, she moved with her parents and siblings to the city of Barbacena, where her father worked in the Orphans' Registry Office and her mother made confectionery. She began her studies at the boarding school of the city's orphanage and, when she was 12, she enrolled in the Escola Normal Municipal de Barbacena. At that time, the Catholic Church maintained a dominant position over families, public education and politics in Minas Gerais. Due to her family's spiritualist and anti-clerical inclinations, from a young age, Maria Lacerda faced discrimination by the bishops of the province.

=== Teaching in Barbacena and first writings ===
In 1904, she graduated as a teacher and, by 1908, she had become the director of the Barbacena Pedagogium. From this post, Maria Lacerda participated in a number of campaigns to address social inequality, by improving literacy rates and advancing education reform. She soon came to adopt the progressive education methods of the Italian feminist educator Maria Montessori and the Catalan anarchist pedagogue Francesc Ferrer. In 1912, she published her first crônicas in a local newspaper, which caused a conflict with her relatives due to her lack of moderation. In 1918, she collected a number of her crônicas and conference speeches into a book on education: Em torno da educação.

At this time, Maria Lacerda also began to form links with Barbacena's feminist associations. As she grew increasingly concerned with the condition that women found themselves in at the time, she began to look for ways to improve it, publicising a number of feminist initiatives that were taking place in Brazil's big cities. By 1919, she had joined the movement for women's suffrage and enthusiastically took up the defense of women's rights to citizenship. As time went on, the news coming from the larger cities drew more of her attention away from her home town. In the following years, Maria Lacerda attended a series of conferences in other cities like Juiz de Fora and Santos, which convinced her to finally leave Barbacena in 1921.

=== Feminist and anarchist activity in São Paulo ===
At the age of 34, Maria Lacerda moved to the São Paulo state capital of São Paulo, where she joined the growing feminist movement, and also made contact with the nascent labor movement. No longer working within the state's official framework, in the radical climate of São Paulo, she was able to develop her sociopolitical ideas and advance her pedagogical activities. While working as a private teacher, she also contributed articles about education to a number of independent and progressive publications, including A Plebe, A Tribuna and O Combate, and by 1923, she was editing the progressive monthly magazine Renascença. Through this publication, Maria Lacerda began to collaborate with the artist Ângelo Guido, who worked as the graphic designer for Renascença and the cover artist for Religião do amor e da beleza, and who drew her towards the esoteric religion of theosophy.

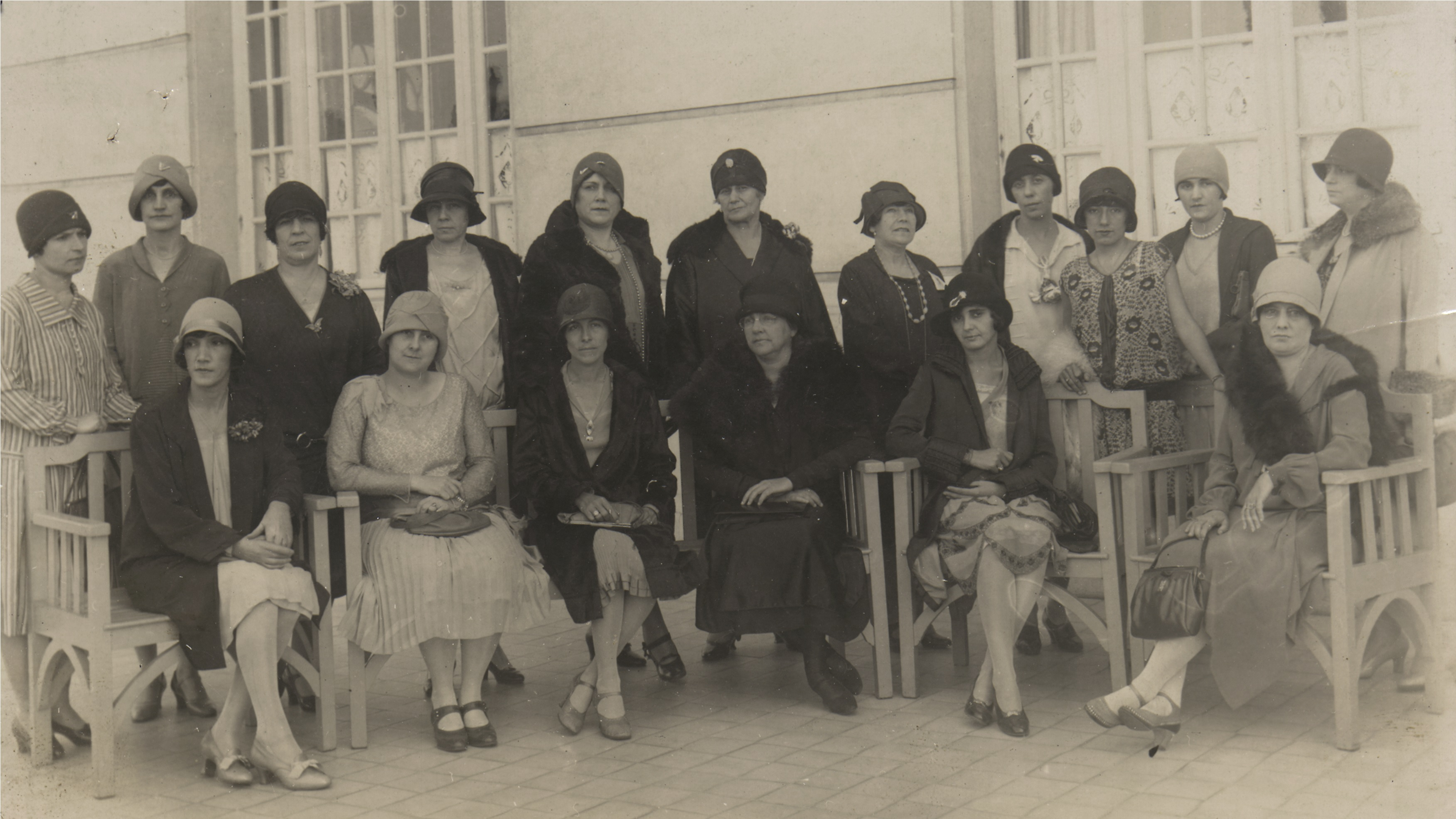
Members of the Brazilian Federation for Women's Progress.

Having already joined the feminist movement while she still lived in Barbacena, upon moving to São Paulo, Maria Lacerda joined Bertha Lutz in co-founding the International Women's Federation (IWF), which aimed to improve women's conditions and society as a whole through women's own combined efforts. Maria Lacerda became the IWF's President and focused her pedagogical efforts on creating a comprehensive curriculum for women's education that included women's history. She also delegated Bertha Lutz to represent the IWF at the Pan-American Women's Conference in Baltimore. But by 1922, she had already begun to break with the organization, as it was growing increasingly concerned only with women's suffrage, which Maria Lacerda herself considered to be an insufficient goal for the feminist movement.

From this period, Maria Lacerda became closer with the Brazilian anarchist movement, despite a number of disagreements with other anarchists over her support for the Soviet education system spearhead by Anatoly Lunacharsky. Despite their criticisms of her position on this issue, Maria Lacerda continued collaborating closeley with the anarchist and syndicalist movement well into the 1930s. In 1926, she became attracted to a form of individualist anarchism from the works of Han Ryner, who greatly inspired her to adopt even more radical conceptions of self-improvement and individual liberty.

=== Experience in Guararema and anti-fascist activism ===
In 1928, Maria Lacera moved to an agricultural commune in Guararema, which had been established by a number of individualist anarchists, immigrant workers and deserters from World War I. The commune was structured without hierarchy, upholding gender equality, workers' self-management and a commitment to nonviolence. On the commune, Maria Lacerda implemented her methods of progressive education, teaching children the French and Italian languages, educating them in history, poetry and nature, and even explaining the social issues of the time.

While staying on the commune, Maria Lacerda reached the height of her writing career, publishing a large number of books, articles and conferences, which had a wide-ranging impact. She also maintained her weekly column in the São Paulo newspaper O Combate, in which she published an article that criticised the reaction to the death of the Italian aviator Carlo Del Prete, denouncing the militarism and fascistic tendencies displayed by much of the Brazilian clergy and mainstream media. This polemic particularly aggravated Italian Brazilian newspapers such as Fanfulla, which provoked a number of rallies against her that even resulted in the destruction of newspaper presses. Despite this violent reaction against them, O Combate maintained their support of Maria Lacerda.

The rise of fascism in Brazil during the early 1930s, particularly with the establishment of groups like Brazilian Integralist Action, aroused Maria Lacerda to begin engaging in antifascist activism. In this period, she doubled down on her anticlericalism, speaking publicly in favour of freedom of thought and participating in anticlerical and secularist coalitions, which agitated against the rising power of the Catholic Church. Maria Lacerda also held a series of anti-war and anti-fascist conferences in Brazil's major cities, and participated in others held in Uruguay and Argentina, where she met the exiled Brazilian communist Luís Carlos Prestes and interviewed him for O Combate. She eventually came to participate in the Women's Committee Against War and Fascism and even broke with the Rosicrucian Order due to its ties with Nazism in Germany.

Maria Lacerda's anti-fascist activism culminated in 1935, with the publication of two books: Clero e fascismo – horda de embrutecedores and Fascismo – filho dilecto da Igreja e do capital. Although largely well-received amongst anti-fascists, the books were sharply criticised by the anarchists of A Plebe, who claimed them to be full of inconsistencies, inaccuracies and contradictions, while particularly taking issue with Maria Lacerda's lack of mention of anarchists and implied support for state communism. Meanwhile, Brazilian communists criticised her books for their advocacy of pacifism, which they rejected in favour of a violent social revolution.

Following the 1937 Brazilian coup d'état, which established the Estado Novo, the commune at Gaurarema became a target for police repression, resulting in the arrest and deportation of many of the community's members, as well as a number of book burnings. In the wake of the coup, Maria Lacerda spent months in hiding, before returning to her home city of Barbacena, where she attempted to resume her work as a school teacher and began practising in the occult.

=== Final years ===
By 1938, Maria Lacerda was beginning to suffer from health problems. That year, she moved to Rio de Janeiro, where she passed between the neighbourhoods of Copacabana and Tijuca, before finally settling in Ilha do Governador. While continuing to teach, she fell deeper into spiritualism, reading horoscopes at Radio Mayrink Veiga and closely collaborating with the Christian anarchist professor Aníbal Vaz de Melo. In 1944, she gave her last lecture, titled O silêncio, at the Antique Rosicrucian Fraternity, in which she discussed Pythagoreanism. Months before the end of World War II in 1945, Maria Lacerda de Moura died and was buried in Saint John the Baptist's Cemetery.

== Personal life ==
From 1905 to 1925, she was married to the civil servant Carlos Ferreira de Moura, with whom she remained lifelong friends. Although the couple bore no children of their own, in 1912, they adopted Maria Lacerda's nephew Jair and an orphan named Carminda. When Jair joined Brazilian Integralist Action in 1935, Maria Lacerda reacted with disgust, publishing an open letter to him in A Lanterna, in which she publicly rebuked him for his decision.

While living in Guararema, Maria Lacerda had a relationship with her fellow teacher André Néblind, which lasted until his arrest and deportation following the 1937 coup.

== Thought and work ==
Although Maria Lacerda herself rejected many of the labels presented to her by her contemporaries, her work has been closest identified with individualist anarchism, due to her staunch rejection of all forms of social inequality and the institutions that perpetuated it, including the state, the exploitation of labour and violence. Her individualism, and especially her pacifism, drew directly from the nonviolent resistance practised and preached by Jesus Christ, Mohandas Gandhi and Leo Tolstoy.

Her activism within educational, anti-clerical and anti-fascist causes brought her closer to many other militants, drawing her particularly close with Brazilian anarchists, especially after breaking with the suffragists over her criticisms of representative democracy. Drawing on the positions of individualist anarchism, Maria Lacerda also defended self-managed small property, without labor exploitation. She ultimately aspired to the establishment of barter economy, as she believed that without financial capital, it would be impossible to finance war.

Maria Lacerda's work is generally characterised by its eloquence, displaying a clear intent to educate the reader for the purpose of their individual emancipation.

=== Feminism ===
From as early as 1918, Maria Lacerda advocated for women's rights to citizenship, education and choice, complete gender equality and the elimination of sexism. Although she initially engaged in the movement for women's suffrage, she came to consider voting rights to be a limited goal for the feminist movement, which she believed should push for further emancipation. She blamed capitalism and misogyny for gender inequality and for the proliferation of prostitution in Brazil, considering that society had made women into slaves of both money and men. Her feminism was also infused with anticlericalism, as she also considered the Catholic clergy's institutional power over families and the education system to be responsible for gender inequality. She additionally contested the views of the Portuguese physician Miguel Bombarda, who had claimed there to be biological and moral reasons for institutional gender inequality.

=== Free love ===
Maria Lacerda criticised traditional sexual morality as inherently repressive. She instead advocated for comprehensive sex education, the normalization of free love, and women's rights to sexual pleasure, divorce and abortion. She denounced the social contract, as she felt it implicitly upheld the male dominance over women's bodies. In Civilização – tronco de escravos, she stated that she considered monogamy to be incompatible with human rights and social progress, as it legally held a man's family to be his private property, which was the basis for social stratification. To Maria Lacerda, the nuclear family, as upheld by the state and the Catholic clergy, was the root of the institutional repression of women's bodies and minds. In Religião do amor e da beleza, she proposed the abolition of gender inequalities and the raising of women's consciousness.

Inspired by the work of Han Ryner, she held the expression of plural love to be the best path towards social progress, as it would subdue crimes of passion associated with monogamy and eliminate the economic exploitation of women through prostitution. For Maria Lacerda, a woman's liberation lay in her ability to choose her own partner and support herself. She differentiated her own idea of plural love from the "Fraternity of Love" advocated by Émile Armand, which she considered to be the extension of marriage to a whole group and thus potentially more oppressive than monogamy. She also criticised Alexandra Kollontai's party political conception of love, which she felt would subordinate the free love of both men and women to the interests of the political class.

=== Anti-fascism ===
Maria Lacerda was a prominent figure within Brazilian anti-fascism, publicly expressing her opposition to Italian fascism, German Nazism and Brazilian Integralism, which she considered to be modern expressions of the clerical inquisition and the counterreformation. She saw fascism as the culmination of an alliance between capitalism, clericalism and statism, which took form in fascism's political repression. To Maria Lacerda, the origins of fascism lay in the social repression carried out by the Church and in the authoritarian character of the nuclear family. Her written works on the subject particularly focus on the alliance between fascism and the Catholic Church, which she considered to have formed as a way to combat the risk of a social revolution.

=== Pacifism ===
Maria Lacerda's anti-fascism was also expressed through her pacifism, as she held war to be the culmination of fascistic policy. Drawing from the pacifist philosophy of Leo Tolstoy, Mohandas Gandhi and Romain Rolland, she proposed a central role for women in anti-war agitation, advocating for a campaign of nonviolent resistance through the refusal of civil service and the carrying out of a sex strike. While calling for direct action against the authorities, she also rejected the use of revolutionary violence, as she considered the aim of social revolution to be an end to all forms of violence and authority.

=== Education ===
Maria Lacerda centred education as a non-violent means for reforming society. She adopted an anarchist pedagogical practice, in opposition to the existing Brazilian educational system, which she considered to be a fundamentally reactionary institution that perpetuated inequality. Influenced by the rationalist pedagogy of Francesc Ferrer, she advocated for universal access to education as a necessary step in the advancement of liberty and social equality, as well as in the progression of women's liberation.

== Recognition and legacy ==
Throughout her life, Maria Lacerda adopted a number of positions similar to those later expounded by second-wave feminism, especially in her criticisms of traditional sexual morality and the culture of Domesticity. In addition to her many written works that denounced gender inequality and exploitation, several of her articles were published in Spanish and Argentine anarchist journals during the 1920s and 1930s, including Estudios and La Revista Blanca. In 1984, in the midst of growing interest in gender studies in Brazil, the publication of Miriam Moreira Leite's biography on Maria Lacerda de Moura revitalized the study of her life and work. Since then, several studies on her work have been carried out in different areas of the human sciences. In 2003, the Image and Sound in Anthropology Laboratory of the University of São Paulo made a thirty minute documentary, entitled Maria Lacerda de Moura - Trajetória de uma rebel, and in 2005, an anthology of Maria Lacerda de Moura's writings was published by her biographer Miriam Moreira Leite.

== Selected works ==
- Em torno da Educação (English: On Education) (1918)
- Renovação (English: Renovation) (1919)
- A mulher é uma degenerada? (English: Is the woman a degenerated being?) (1924)
- Religião do amor e da beleza (English: Religion of love and beauty) (1926)
- Clero e Fascismo, horda de embrutecedores (English: Clergy and Fascism, horde of brutalisers) (1933)
- Fascismo – filho dileto da Igreja e do Capital (English: Fascism - beloved child of the Church and Capital) (1933)
- O Silêncio (English: The Silence) (1944)

== Bibliography ==
- Ackelsberg, Martha (2005) [1991]. "Anarchist Revolution and the Liberation of Women". Free Women of Spain (2nd ed.). Oakland: AK Press. pp. 37–60. ISBN 1-902593-96-0. LCCN 2003113040. OCLC 63382446.
- Almedia, Jaqueline Moraes de (December 2021). "Mulheres contra o fascismo". Faces de Eva: Estudos Sobre a Mulher (in Portuguese). 46 (2021): 83–100. doi:10.34619/xrix-ixoe. ISSN 0874-6885. OCLC 9531082907 – via SciELO.
- Freitas da Silva, Filipe Gordino (2011). "Lacerda de Moura, Maria (1887–1945)". In Ness, Immanuel (ed.). The International Encyclopedia of Revolution and Protest. Wiley-Blackwell. pp. 1–2. doi:10.1002/9781405198073.wbierp1787. ISBN 9781405198073. OCLC 8682011451.
- Leite, Míriam Lifchitz Moreira (1984). Outra Face do Feminismo: Maria Lacerda de Moura (in Portuguese). São Paulo: Ática. OCLC 12190289.
- Leite, Míriam Lifchitz Moreira (1986). "Maria Lacerda de Moura e o anarquismo". In Arnoni Prado, Antonio (ed.). Libertários no Brasil: memória, lutas, cultura (in Portuguese). São Paulo: Brasiliense. pp. 82–97. OCLC 17507648.
- Leite, Míriam Lifchitz Moreira (2020). "Lacerda de Moura, Maria". Diccionario Biográfico de las Izquierdas Latinoamericanas (in Portuguese). Buenos Aires: CeDInCI. ISSN 2718-644X. Archived from the original on 18 June 2021.
- Mendes, Samanta Colhado (2018). "Anarquismo e feminismo: as mulheres libertárias no Brasil". In Santos, Kauan Willian; Silva, Rafael Viana (eds.). História do anarquismo e do sindicalismo de intenção revolucionária no Brasil: novas perspectivas (in Portuguese). Curitiba: Prismas. pp. 173–206. ISBN 978-8555079528. OCLC 1333086354.
- Miranda, Jussara Valéria de (2006). "Recuso-me"! Ditos e escritos de Maria Lacerda de Moura (PDF) (Thesis) (in Portuguese). Uberlândia: Federal University of Uberlândia.
- Queluz, Gilson Leandro (October 2011). "Representations of science and technology in Brazilian anarchism: José Oiticica and Maria Lacerda de Moura". Circumscribere: International Journal for the History of Science. 10. Pontifical Catholic University of São Paulo. ISSN 1980-7651. OCLC 220247548.
- Rago, Margareth (1995). "As mulheres na historiografia brasileira". In Zélia Lopes, Silva (ed.). Cultura Histórica em Debate (in Portuguese). São Paulo: UNESP. pp. 81–91. ISBN 8571390754. OCLC 33664684.
- Rago, Margareth (2007). "Ética, anarquia e revolução em Maria Lacerda de Moura". In Ferreira, Jorge; Reis, Daniel Aarão (eds.). As esquerdas no Brasil (in Portuguese). Vol. 1. Rio de Janeiro: Civilização Brasileira. pp. 273–293. OCLC 912747775.
- Ramos Flores, Maria Bernardete (2020). "O destino indelével do desejo". Estudos Feministas (in Portuguese). 28 (3): 1–16. doi:10.1590/1806-9584-2020v28n361583. ISSN 1806-9584. JSTOR 26965148. OCLC 9434115769. S2CID 229624089.
- Soihet, Rachel (2002). "Formas de Violência, Relações de Gênero e Feminismo" (PDF). Revista Gênero (in Portuguese). 2 (2). Brasília: Ministério da Educação: 7–26. doi:10.22409/rg.v2i2.452.
