= La Battaglia =

Anarchist periodical

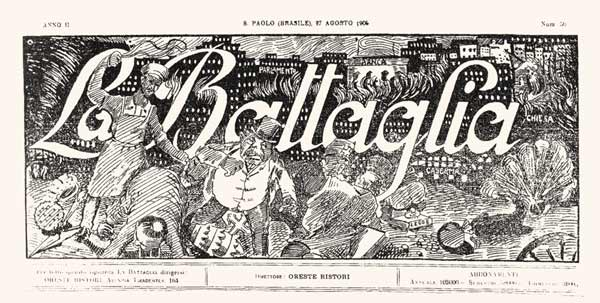
- Headline of the anarchist periodical La Battaglia, edited in Brazil by Italian libertarians.
- Type: Weekly newspaper
- Editor: Oreste Ristori; Gigi Damiani
- Founded: 1901
- Political alignment: Anarchism
- Language: Italian
- Ceased publication: 1912
- Relaunched: La Barricata
- City: São Paulo
- Country: Brazil

La Battaglia (English: The Battle) was an anarchist periodical edited by a group of Italian libertarians in São Paulo, Brazil. First published in 1901, it became a weekly periodical from 1904 onwards, under the direction of Oreste Ristori. In 1912, under the direction of Gigi Damiani, La Battaglia merged with Germinal, edited by Angelo Bandoni and Florentino de Carvalho, giving rise to the periodical La Barricata.

== Bibliography ==
- Alvarenga, Lucas Thiago Rodarte (2020). "Nos bastidores de um jornal anarquista: as particularidades do processo de produção de um jornal libertário na Primeira República Brasileira (1900-1935)". Crítica Histórica (in Portuguese). 11 (21): 66–92. OCLC 8700590765.
- Biondi, Luigi (1998). "Anarquistas italianos em São Paulo. O grupo do jornal anarquista "La Bataglia" e a sua visão da sociedade brasileira: o embate entre imaginários libertários e etnocêntricos". Cadernos AEL (in Portuguese) (8/9): 117–149.
