= Jucundus =

Jucundus (masculine; variants include Iocundus, Iucundus, Jocund, Jocundus, Jukund) or Jucunda (feminine) is a given name of several Christian saints:

- Jucundus (3rd century – 250), martyr in Africa. His feast is celebrated on 9 January
- Jucundus of Troyes (3rd century – 273), martyr in Troyes. His feast is celebrated on 21 July
- Jucundus of Sirmium (4th century), martyr in Pannonia. His feast is celebrated on 6 January
- Jucundus of Aosta (4th century – c. 407), bishop of Aosta. His feast day is celebrated on 30 December.
- Jucundus of Rheims, lector of Nicasius of Rheims
- Jucunda (4th century – 466). Her feast is celebrated on 25 November
- Jucundus of Bologna (c. 5th century), bishop of Bologna. His feast day is celebrated on 14 November
- Jucundus, 5th-century bishop of Sufetula (modern-day Sbeitla, Tunisia)
- Jucunda, martyr in Nicomedia. Her feast is celebrated on 27 July

== See also ==
- Jucundian or Jucundianus (3rd century), martyr in Africa. His feast is celebrated on 4 July
- Giocondo (disambiguation)
- Gioconda (disambiguation)
- Joconde (disambiguation)
