= Miriam Moreira Leite =

Brazilian sociologist, writer, researcher and university teacher

Miriam Lifchitz Moreira Leite
- Born: 17 May 1926; Santos, São Paulo, Brazil
- Died: 17 February 2013 (aged 86); Santos, São Paulo, Brazil
- Education: University of São Paulo
- Occupation: Sociologist
- Spouse: Dante Moreira Leite

Miriam Lifchitz Moreira Leite (Santos, 17 May 1926 - 17 February 2013) was a Brazilian sociologist, researcher, university professor and writer, winner of the Jabuti Award.

Miriam was among the first intellectuals in São Paulo to get involved in the fight for women's rights.

== Biography ==
Born in Santos, in 1926, Miriam graduated in Social Sciences and History at the University of São Paulo, in 1944. She did a post-doctoral internship at the Eastman Foundation KODAK, and was one of the founders of the Center for Studies and Research on Women (Portuguese: Núcleo de Estudos e Pesquisa sobre a Mulher, NEMGE), in 1985, and since 1998 participated in the Visual Anthropology Group (Portuguese: Grupo de AntropologiaVisual, GRAVI) at the University of São Paulo.

Miriam was the main researcher of Maria Lacerda de Moura's work, analyzing even her personal boxes and photo albums, and published the biographical study Outra cara do feminismo: Maria Lacerda de Moura. She continued to conduct historiographical research on Maria Lacerda, and published Maria Lacerda de Moura, uma feminista utópica in 2005.

In 1993, she published Retratos de Família, a book where she analyzes family photographs of immigrants who came to São Paulo between 1890 and 1930. This is her most widely read and awarded work, with which she won the Jabuti Award.

== Personal life ==
She was married to Dante Moreira Leite, with whom she had two children.

== Works ==
- Leite, Miriam L. M. (2005). Maria Lacerda De Moura - Uma Feminista Utópica (in Portuguese). Brazil: Mulheres. p. 366. ISBN 978-8575780930.
- Leite, Miriam L. M. (2001). Retratos de Família. Leitura da Fotografia Histórica (in Portuguese) (3rd ed.). São Paulo: EDUSP. p. 196. ISBN 978-8531401664.
- Leite, Miriam L. M. (1997). Livros De Viagem (1803-1900) (in Portuguese). Rio de Janeiro: UFRJ. p. 263. ISBN 978-8571081734.

== Awards ==
- 1994 — Winner in Literary Studies (Essays) of the 36th Prêmio Jabuti, for the work Retratos de Família
