= Gioconda (disambiguation) =

The Gioconda or la Gioconda (/lə ˌdʒiːəˈkɒndə/ lə JEE-ə-KON-də, Italian: [la dʒoˈkonda]; "the joyful one" [f.]) is the Italian name of the Mona Lisa, a portrait painting by Leonardo da Vinci.

Gioconda or la Gioconda may also refer to:

- Lisa del Giocondo, the model depicted in da Vinci's painting
- La Gioconda (opera), an 1876 opera by Amilcare Ponchielli
- La Gioconda (play), tragedy by Gabriele d'Annunzio
- La Gioconda (cafe), a former restaurant in London
- Gioconda, a feminine given name notably borne by:
  - Gioconda Belli (born 1948), Nicaraguan-born novelist
  - Gioconda de Vito (1907–1994), Italian-British classical violinist
  - Gioconda Mussolini (1913–1969), Brazilian anthropologist
  - Gioconda Rizzo (1897–2004), Brazilian photographer
  - Gioconda Salvadori (1912–1998), Italian writer

== See also ==
- Giocondo (disambiguation)
- Joconde (disambiguation)
- Jucundus (disambiguation)
