= Mário Pedrosa =

Brazilian art critic

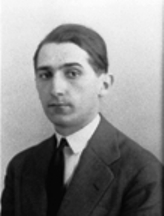
- Born: Mário Xavier de Andrade Pedrosa; April 25, 1900; Timbaúba, Pernambuco, Brazil
- Died: November 5, 1981 (aged 81); Rio de Janeiro, Brazil
- Education: Humboldt University of Berlin; International Lenin School
- Occupations: Lawyer, journalist, art critic, essayist
- Political party: Brazilian Communist Party; Communist League
- Other political affiliations: Workers' Party
- Awards: Ordem do Mérito Cultural

Mário Xavier de Andrade Pedrosa (25 April 1900 – 5 November 1981) was a Brazilian art and literary critic, journalist, art historian and political activist.

== Biography ==
Pedrosa was born in to the family of Pedro da Cunha Pedrosa, who was a senator.

Initially affiliated with the Brazilian Communist Party, he was expelled in 1929 because of his relationship with the Trotskyist movement. On January 21, 1931, together with Lívio Xavier, Fúlvio Abramo, Aristides Lobo and Benjamin Péret he founded the Communist League related to the International Left Opposition.

On September 3, 1938, in Périgny, France, he represented several Latin American workers' parties at the Founding Congress of the Fourth International, under the pseudonym Lebrun, where he was elected to the International Executive Committee (IEC) of the Fourth International.

Pedrosa was a regular critic for Correio da Manhã (1945–1951) and later for Jornal do Brasil (1957).

Pedrosa lived mostly in exile during the military dictatorship of Brazil. From 1970 to 1973 he worked in Chile, supporting the socialist government of Salvador Allende.

In 1980 he participated in the founding of the Workers' Party of Brazil.

Mário Pedrosa died in November 1981 after suffering from cancer for years and was buried at the Cemitério de São João Batista.

== Works ==
- Arte Necessidade Vital. Livraria da Casa, 1949.
- Panorama da Pintura Moderna. Rio de Janeiro: Ministério de Educação e Saúde, 1952.
- A Opção Brasileira. Rio de Janeiro: Editora Civilização Brasileira, 1966.
- A Opção Imperialista. Rio de Janeiro: Editora Civilização Brasileira, 1966.
- Calder. Paris: Maeght éditeur, 1975.
- Mundo, Homem, Arte em Crise. São Paulo: Editora Perspectiva, 1975.
- Arte, Forma e Personalidade. São Paulo: Kairós, 1979.
- A Crise Mundial do Imperialismo e Rosa Luxemburgo. Rio de Janeiro: Civilização Brasileira, 1979.
- Sobre o PT. São Paulo: Ched, 1980
