= Gioconda Rizzo =

Brazilian photographer

- Born: April 18, 1897; São Paulo, São Paulo, Brazil
- Died: March 22, 2004 (aged 106); São Paulo
- Occupation: Photographer

Gioconda Rizzo (April 18, 1897 — March 22, 2004) was a Brazilian photographer, the first woman to open a photography studio in Brazil.

== Life ==
Gioconda was born in São Paulo in 1897, from a family of Italian descent; her father, Michele Rizzo was a photographer and owned a studio, Ateliê Rizzo, at Rua Direita, in the downtown. The daughter began to photograph at the age of fourteen, without her father's knowledge. Michele, displeased at first, soon allowed Gioconda to work in the studio, photographing only women and children.

Gioconda innovated by photographing her subjects by framing only the shoulders and face, instead of the entire body. Her portraits were successful among the São Paulo high society women. She also innovated by portraying women with veils, exposed shoulders and flower arrangements, and using the magnesium flash. In 1914 she opened her own studio called Photo Femina, alongside her father, where she specialized in female portraits. The studio closed in 1916, under pressure from conservative society at the time, when Gioconda's brother Vicente discovered that some of her clients were French and Polish courtesans.

Gioconda returned to work in her father's studio, making oil-colored portraits. In 1925 she specialized in the technique of applying the photographic film on enamel and porcelain, for use in jewelry, dishes and tombs. Among the personalities portrayed by Gioconda were the first Miss Brazil, Zezé Leone (1922), and the Miss Universe, Yolanda Pereira (1931) She is the author of the photograph of writer Zélia Gattai 's family that illustrates the 1979 edition of her work Anarquistas, Graças a Deus, by Círculo do Livro.

She married in 1926, with the merchant Onofre Pasqualucci (died in 1935), with whom she had a daughter. She later opened the studio Gioconda Rizzo and continued working until the 1960s.

In 1982 her work was "rediscovered" and her photos were exhibited at Fotogaleria Fotótica, in São Paulo.

She died in 2004, a few weeks before turning 107. Her body was buried in the Cemitério da Consolação.

== Gallery ==
Photos by Gioconda:

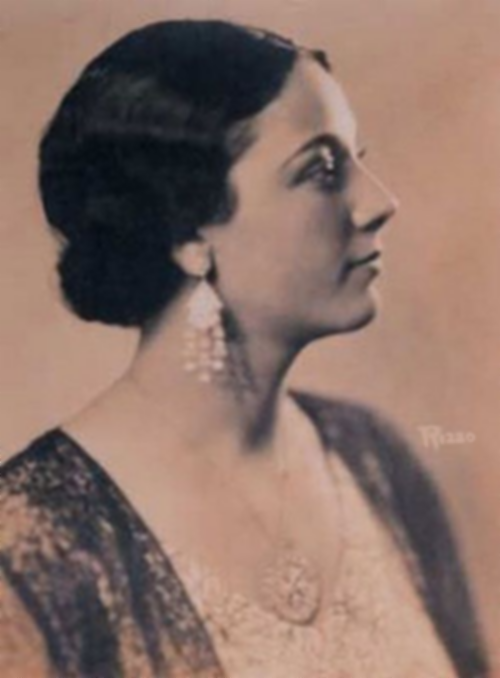
Yolanda Pereira

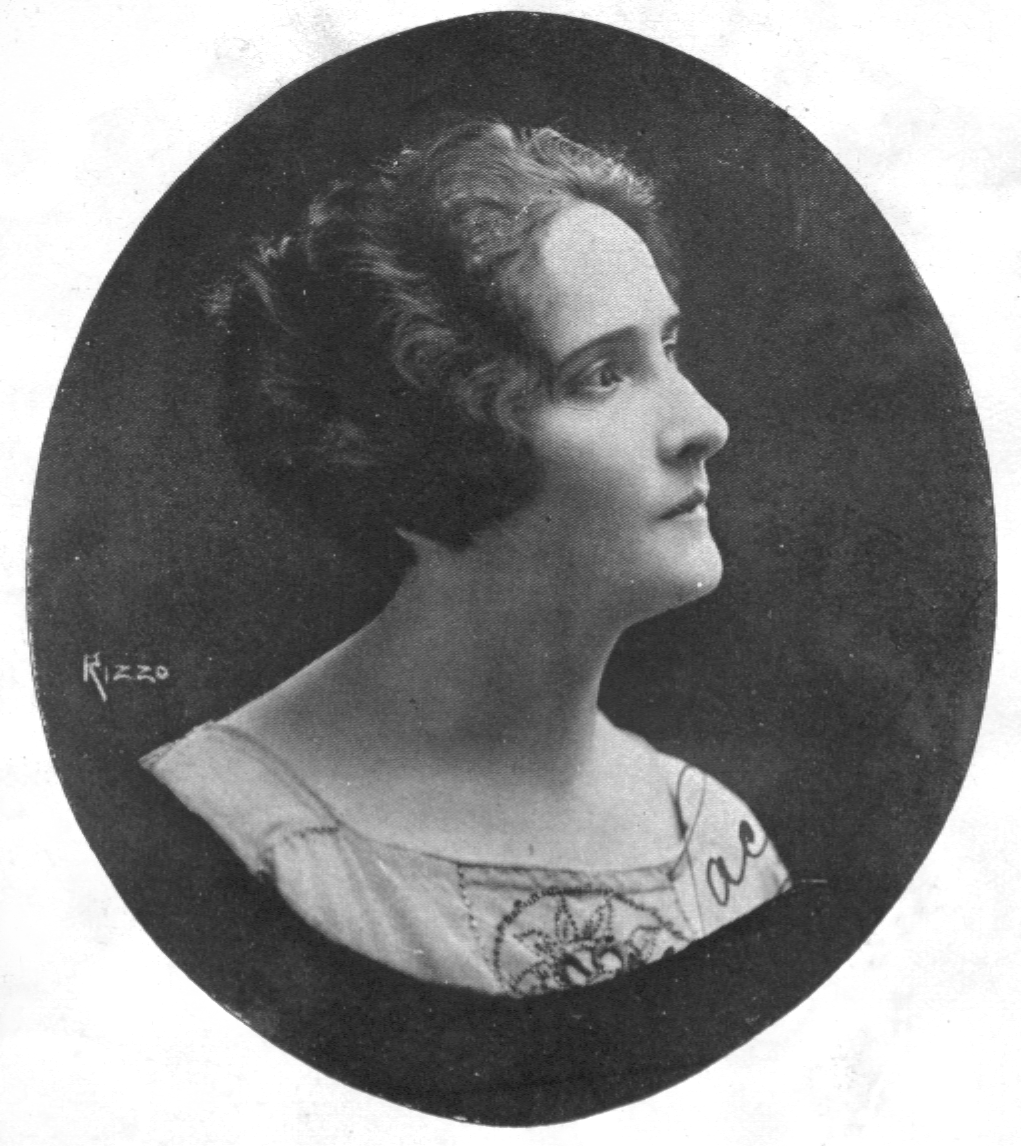
Maria Lacerda de Moura
