= Giocondo =

Giocondo may refer to:

- Giovanni Giocondo (c. 1433 – 1515), an Italian Franciscan friar and architect
- Giocondo family, the family of Lisa del Giocondo
- Giocondo, a character in Orlando furioso
- Giocondo, an Italian masculine given name, notably borne by
  - Giocondo Albertolli (1742–1839), a Swiss-born architect
  - Giocondo Pio Lorgna (1870–1928), an Italian Roman Catholic priest

== See also ==
- Gioconda (disambiguation)
- Jucundus (disambiguation)
