= Emília Freitas =

- Born: January 11, 1855; Aracati, Brazil
- Died: October 18, 1908 (aged 53); Manaus, Brazil
- Spouse: Antonio Vieira (m. 1900)
- Writing career
- Language: Portuguese
- Genre: Fantasy
- Notable work: A Rainha do Ignoto (1899)

Emília Freitas (11 January 1855 – 18 October 1908) was a Brazilian novelist, poet, and teacher. She wrote what is considered the first Brazilian fantasy novel, A Rainha do Ignoto (1899; The queen of the unknown), about a utopian society inhabited by women.

== Life ==
Freitas was born in 1855, in Aracati, in the then province of Ceará. She was the daughter of the lieutenant colonel Antonio José de Freitas and Maria de Jesus Freitas. After her father's death, the family moved to Fortaleza, where Freitas studied French, English, geography and arithmetic in a private school.

Later she moved to the Normal School, becoming a teacher. In 1873, she began to write poems for several literary newspapers of Ceará and Pará like O Libertador, O Cearense and O lyrio e a brisa. Most of these poems were later compiled in the volume titled Canções do lar (1891). A year later, after her mother's death, she moved to Manaus with his brother, teaching at the Instituto Benjamin Constant for boys.

In 1900, she married and returned to her home state with her husband, the journalist Antonio Vieira, editor of Jornal de Fortaleza. de Freitas participated actively in the Sociedade das Cearenses Libertadoras, an abolitionist society, having even spoken in 1893 in the gallery, a fact that was much applauded and reported in the newspapers.

In 1899, she published her main work, A Rainha do Ignoto, which was called a "psychological novel". The book, about an utopian island ruled by a society of women, is considered by some experts as one of the pioneering works of the fantasy genre in Brazil. Out of print since its first release, the book got its second edition in 1980, becoming rediscovered and subject of feminist literary criticism studies.

On October 18, 1908, Emília Freitas died in Manaus, where she had returned after the death of her husband.

== Works ==
- 1891- Canções do lar, poems;
- 1899 - A Rainha do Ignoto, novel
- unknown- O Renegado, novel
