= List of ships named Golconda =

Several ships have been named Golconda for Golconda Fort:

- Golconda (1807 ship) was launched at Scituate, Massachusetts. Initially she sailed between Liverpool and the United States. Later she made 15 whaling voyages from New Bedford between 1819 and 1864 when CSS Florida captured and burnt her on 8 July 1864
- Golconda (1815 ship) was launched at Calcutta. She made one voyage for the British East India Company from India to England in 1819. She spent the bulk of her career as a country ship, trading in the East Indies until she wrecked in September 1840 while carrying troops from Madras to Canton.
- Golconda (1825 ship) was launched as Newbury, Massachusetts and made four whaling voyages before she was sold to California in 1848
- Golconda (1853 ship), of 1,016 tons, was built at Warren, Maine. The American Colonization Society (ACS) purchased her in 1866. Under the ownership of the ACS she carried freedmen as settlers from America to Liberia.
- SS Golconda (1863) was an iron screw brig of 1,909 gross register tons (GRT), built by Thames Iron Works at Blackwall, London for P&O Line's Suez-Calcutta service; she was sold her at Bombay (Mumbai) in 1881 for breaking up.
- SS Golconda (1882) was a 2,114 GRT passenger-cargo ship, built by A. & J. Inglis at Glasgow for the British India Line's coastal services. In 1884 she was sold to Her Majesty's Indian Marine as the troopship Canning. After returning to commercial service in 1907 as Budrie, she was sold to the Admiralty in 1915 and scuttled in Scapa Flow as a blockship.
- SS Golconda (1887) was a 5,874 GRT passenger-cargo ship of the British India Line that was lost in 1916.
- SS Golconda (1919) was a 5,316 GRT cargo ship, built by William Gray & Company at Sunderland for the British India Line. She was wrecked in the Karnaphuli river, Chittagong in 1940.
