= A Plebe =

Defunct Brazilian newspaper

A Plebe was an anarchist and anticlerical periodical published in Brazil by Fábio Lopes dos Santos Luz and Edgard Leuenroth, first released on January 9, 1917, until 1951, with some interruptions. In the beginning, A Plebe was published weekly, bringing subjects about strikes and libertarian demonstrations that it supported.

Founded on the strength of the libertarian currents that were emerging among the workers of the time, the newspaper A Plebe was created during a period of strong manifestations and political fights that took place in the streets of São Paulo. During the circulation period, the anarchist newspaper was interrupted a few times, as its directors were arrested a couple of times.

A Plebe had two phases of distribution: from 1917 until the interruption in the 1930s, and then from 1947 until 1951, when it was effectively finalized. The second period was considered more emblematic than the first, since the country was going through a phase of redemocratization and reorganization of left-wing movements. During the period of the new revival, both of the country and of the newspaper, the editors were aware of the difficulty they would have in disseminating content that followed the newspaper's editorial, in support of movements with libertarian, anarchist and anticlerical causes.

The newspaper also published news about several countries, focusing mainly on components from Latin America and Spain. A Plebe became known for its diverse content, whether drawings, cartoons or literature, which aimed to disseminate the causes defended and doctrinal ideologies. The pages highlighted the problems that the proletarians faced every day, criticizing, not always in a subtle way, the capitalist system in which they lived, the upper middle class and, of course, the Catholic Church, which in the newspaper's conception, instigated the attitudes of the elite.

Despite its end in 1951, A Plebe carries a symbolic influence on a large part of society, since, through its printed publications, it represented a social group that needed a support to stimulate and strengthen workers in the struggle for their interests. Without this periodical and others that came before, such as A Lanterna, a portion of the community would never be heard and portrayed, strengthening the exclusion of the group in Brazilian society.

== History ==
Under the command of Edgar Leuenroth, A Peble was launched in the period of the First World War, when workers' wages and lives were unstable, destabilized. As a sequel to another anticlerical periodical of the time, the newspaper claimed, in its very first published material, to be an extension of A Lanterna. As a result, the newspaper intended to be the organization for the workers' struggle against the oppression and misery experienced by the lower class in Brazil.

Created in the midst of the 1917 strike, the A Plebe was staffed by editors who had an involvement with libertarian movements. Editor-owner Edgar Leuenroth was directly involved in the protests and became one of the leaders of the '17 movement, both in person, offering support on the streets, and in the pages of the A Plebe. For getting so heavily involved in this strike, Leuenroth was arrested, accused of leading the looting that took place at Santista Mill. As a result, the police entered the newsroom and the newspaper had its doors closed. To avoid leaving the journal without publications, Florentino de Carvalho, one of the anarchists who collaborated for the A Plebe, carried on the flow period, but, of course, hiding by pseudonyms and subtle criticism of the State.

After almost four years, in 1921, the owner reopened the newsroom and the flow of publications returned to normal, but in July 1924, when a state of siege was decreed in Brazil, the A Plebe ceased to be published again. Shortly before the newspaper ceased to circulate, full responsibility rested with Pedro A. Mota, a militant who held the post from 1923 to 1924. When the rioting settled down, in 1927, the journal returned to normal distribution, now with reports about the exile of activists and workers who were participating in the whole movement that occurred in 1924.

With the implementation of the Celerada Law, which established repression in workers' newspapers and within the unions themselves, the A Plebe was also affected, leading to interruptions in its publication in 1932. Regardless of this instability, during the 1930s, the newspaper focused on the dissemination of anti-fascist content, mentioning names of governments, movements, churches and also reporting meetings held by the Center for Social Culture (CCS). In 1934, as proof of the allegations that occurred at the time, the A Plebe published a copy that directly accused the government of Getúlio Vargas, together with the Catholic Church, of being and applying Nazi-fascist concepts.

With the approach of two major conservative forces - the integralist movement and the Catholic Church - several militants who considered themselves anarchists began to join the National Liberation Alliance (ANL), despite the fact that the political actions it recommended and followed were not 100% accepted by its members. Once again, because of government repression of the Alliance, the newspaper was closed in 1935, but would be relaunched twelve years later.

In May 1947, A Plebe was reopened by Edgar Leuenroth. In a different political context, the newspaper's objective remained the same: to rekindle the libertarian movements and the militancy of each trade union. To do this, the editor-owner needed the help of some collaborators, such as Liberto Lemos Reis and Lucca Gabriel, young people who were already involved in militancy and articulated to the CCS. During the last period in which it remained active, the newspaper was directed and edited by Rodolpho Felippe, and remained like this until 1951, when it stopped being published completely.

== Editorial ==
Since its creation, the A Plebe has always been focused on creating content that addressed and supported proletarian libertarian movements, giving voice to the demands of the people that were considered invisible or less important to the government. Throughout its period of existence, the A Plebe went through several changes, censorship and restrictions imposed by government measures. As a way of criticizing all the relations created by the government with the clergy, the anarchist and anticlerical newspaper disseminated content in different languages, such as cartoons, images, poetry, literary texts and a refined denunciation material, being considered a more journalistic content. All the information disseminated aimed to spread the working class and libertarian cause of society at the time.

Despite the changes during its time of circulation, the A Plebe kept a section that addressed the organizations and actions of the unions in São Paulo. There were also sections dedicated to promoting materials aimed at libertarian ideology, in addition to bringing, in a format similar to the book section, articles that helped the reader to situate themselves on subjects such as anarchism, communism, Bolshevism and other avenues of the left-wing movement.

=== Women's Freedom and Sexuality ===
One of the topics addressed in the A Plebe was sexuality and freedom. As a periodical that defended libertarian causes of the working class, the newspaper became one of the most important of the time. In 1935, one of the calmest years in the journal's history, several themes were addressed, including the feminist struggle and the involvement of gender in all the revolutionary manifestations of the period.

The presence of the female figure is visible in several areas of the content, such as in the collaboration of the newspaper. Already at this time, women signed their content, discussed and debated their ideologies and raised questions about society.

One of the main collaborators of the newspaper was Isa Ruti, who gained prominence for the material "An appeal that must be heard". In the text released, the activist asked for financial help for the newspaper, which was going through a delicate moment since it could not maintain its circulation periodically. The space Isa had in the newspaper was gratifying, considering that she was a woman in a totally different time, but it does not exclude the contrast in which she lived within the newsrooms. In an excerpt from her text, Isa quotes: "My sensitive woman's heart contains a lot of love for human beings. I will use this love to give what I could give, if I were a man and smoked, for the benefit of the 'Plebe'".

Even though the anarchist feminist movement was present in the pages of the A Plebe, many of the statements did not hold a common bond. This happened because the collaborators had different backgrounds, different ages and different ways of expressing themselves. While some presented appeals, like Isa, others bet on texts with more insults, showing anger and anguish for the moment in which they lived. This is why it is difficult to generalize the feminist movement that took place within the newspaper. Some of these women, besides Isa Ruti, were Maria Lacerda de Moura, Alba Moscalega and Juliette Witheatname.

Among these women, one of the most discussed topics was women's sexuality, the power over their bodies, as well as bodily exploitation, a subject that would develop over the following decades. The speeches were composed of literary texts, experimental reports and content aimed at offering an analysis beyond morality that dealt with troubled subjects as something to be clarified and discussed. Throughout the pages, readers could find proposals for debates on motherhood, contraception, abortion, sex education, prostitution, among others.

The biggest question hanging over these themes is not just the fact that they are written by both male and female anarchists, but the difference between the discourse of each gender. When the perspective came from the male writer, it did not question the male positioning towards certain situations (such as prostitution, if it was being discussed in a new context, the client's attitudes should be adapted and debated as well), only the presence of women in these themes. For example, in 1935, the anarchist Marques da Costa published an experience lived by some friends in France. In the material released, Costa said that those involved had been arrested on charges of two crimes under the French Penal Code: provocation of abortion and mutilation of genital organs. In addition to denouncing the police for their actions, the anarchist congratulates the group of friends for being an example to the culture that the newspaper supports.

=== Education ===
A Plebe also published content that discussed the education of women and children of the lower middle class. Since its first edition, the newspaper has criticized the government and the lack of education for this social class.

Libertarian education, the focus of the newspaper, began with the arrival of immigrants to serve as labor in coffee plantations, where, even bringing together diverse cultures, thoughts and values, the line of anarchist thought stood out. As the illiteracy rate was high in the working class, libertarians saw newspapers as a way to pass on their thoughts and ideals to the workers.

A Plebe was one of the newspapers that kept the line of argument that the libertarians wanted to implement in order to stop illiteracy, both literal and conceptual, and to win more followers to this ideology. Since the purpose of the periodical was to bring the truth to the readers, presenting in the most exposed way the entire political system suffered by them, the A Plebe denounced the entire Education Network that was sponsored by the State.

The anarchists wanted the people to see the truth that was going on in their daily lives and not see the whole routine as a normal abusive system. In some of the journal's publications, journalists reported on the entire dominant and exploitative structure created by the government, telling of its aims to indoctrinate children to occupy their "already predetermined" places. A Plebe had the will to fight for the education of those who, if they depended on the state system, would never have access to knowledge, making a future collective revolt impossible.

== See also ==
- Anarchism in Brazil
- Brazilian Workers' Confederation
- Syndicalism
- Workers' self-management
- Class conflict
- Anarchist communism
- Anarcho-syndicalism
