= A Lanterna =

Anarchist periodical

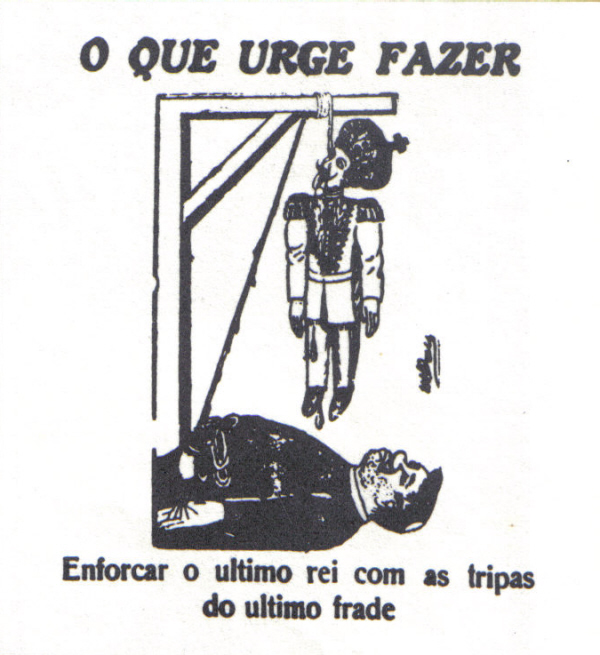
Anarchist cartoon published in 1916 in the newspaper "A Lanterna".

A Lanterna (English: The Lantern) was an anarchist periodical founded by Benjamim Mota, whose main theme was anti-clericalism, published in Brazil at the beginning of the 20th century in three distinct phases, directed by Benjamim Mota from 1901 to 1904, by Edgard Leuenroth from 1909 to 1916 and from 1933 to 1935. José Oiticica published his first anarchist text in it.
