= Oreste Ristori =

Italian-Brazilian anarchist (1874–1943)

- Born: 12 August 1874; San Miniato
- Died: 2 December 1943 (aged 69); Florence, Italy
- Cause of death: Execution

Oreste Ristori (San Miniato, 12 August 1874 – Florence, 2 December 1943) was an Italian anarchist and journalist. One of many Italians to migrate to Brazil in the early 20th century, Ristori played an important role in the spread of leftist radicalism in Brazil.

Ristori first emigrated to Buenos Aires in 1902. After local authorities tried to deport him, he escaped to Montevideo and subsequently to São Paulo. Quickly becoming a prominent anarchist organizer, he founded the Italian-language weekly La Battaglia in São Paulo in 1904.

In 1934, Ristori was among the leaders of the anti-fascist faction in the Battle of Praça da Sé.

Ristori returned to Europe to participate in the Spanish Civil War. After crossing the French border, he was captured and repatriated to Italy by the Vichy regime in 1940. He was then imprisoned in Italy. In 1943, Ristori was executed by the Italian Social Republic in retaliation for the assassination of a Fascist officer by partisans.
