= Edgard Leuenroth =

Brazilian writer (1881–1968)

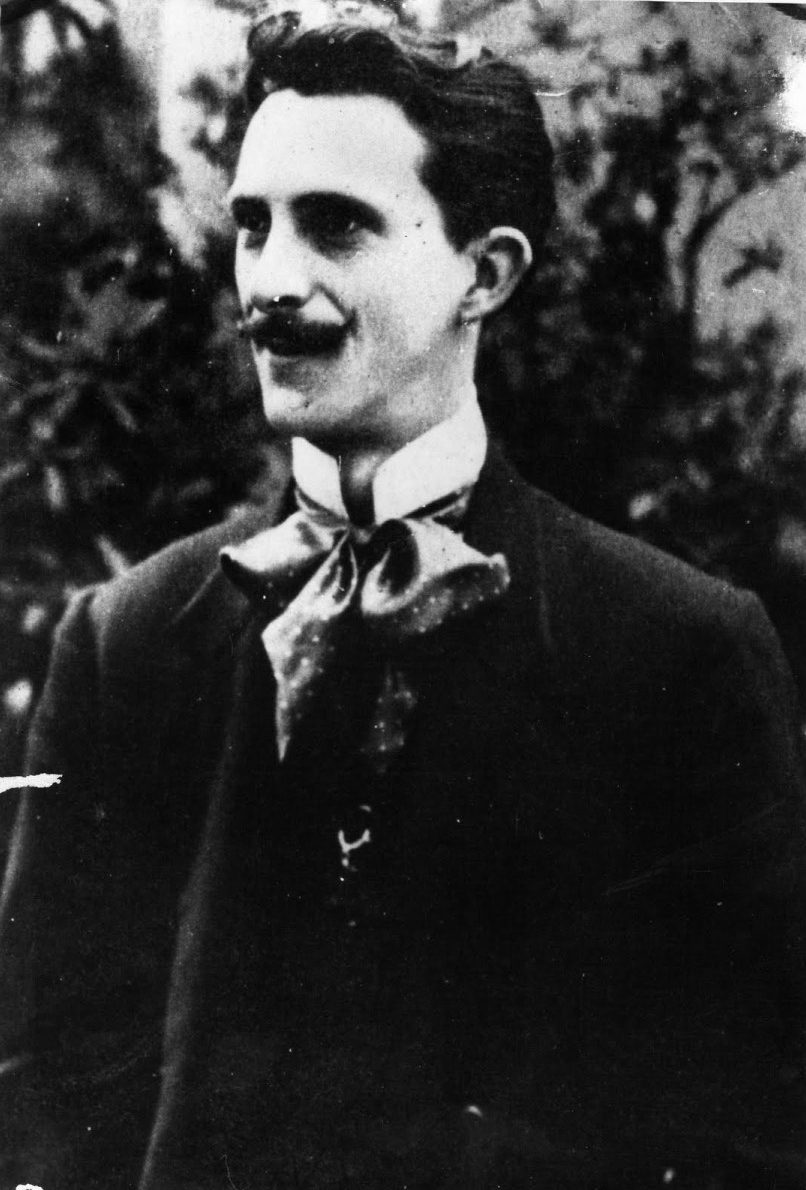
- Born: October 31, 1881; Mogi Mirim, São Paulo, Empire of Brazil
- Died: September 28, 1968 (aged 86); São Paulo, São Paulo, Brazil

Edgard Leuenroth (October 31, 1881 – September 28, 1968) was a Brazilian journalist, publisher and writer, who became famous for his documentation of the country's earliest social movements, particularly the communist, socialist and anarchist worker's and intellectual's activities and movements. He founded the Brazilian newspaper A Plebe with Fábio Lopes dos Santos Luz.

== Early life ==
Leuenroth was born to German immigrant parents in the city of Mogi Mirim, in the province of São Paulo, Brazil, on October 31, 1881. At the age of five, he moved with his mother to the city of São Paulo.
