= Communist League (Brazil) =

Communist League Liga Comunista
- Leader: Mario Pedrosa
- Founded: January 1931
- Dissolved: May 1, 1934
- Split from: Brazilian Communist Party
- Succeeded by: Internationalist Communist League
- Ideology: Trotskyism
- Political position: Far-left
- International affiliation: International Left Opposition

The Communist League (Portuguese: Liga Comunista) was a grouping of the Left Opposition in Brazil, formed in 1931, operating within the Brazilian Communist Party (PCB) and which gave rise, in 1934, to the Internationalist Communist League, an organization formed by Mario Pedrosa, Lívio Xavier, Fúlvio Abramo, Aristides Lobo, Benjamin Péret, Rodolfo Coutinho, Wenceslau Escobar Azambuja, among other PCB activists and union members such as Joaquim Barbosa (PCB secretary for union affairs), João Costa Pimenta (trade union veteran, grandfather of Rui Costa Pimenta, who in the future would be leader of the Workers' Cause Party, Leonel Pessoa (former cadet, expelled from the Army for participating in the Vaccine Revolt in 1904, who at the time worked as a graphic worker), João Dalla Dea (graphic worker).

== History ==
As Mario Pedrosa, a Communist Party activist, describes, when he was traveling to take a political training course in the Soviet Union in 1929, in Germany he came into contact with Leon Trotsky's criticisms of the policy implemented by the Communist International. Later, through an intense correspondence with Lívio Xavier, he informed Brazilian militants of the existing differences. Mário returned to Brazil in July 1929 and first organized the Lenin Communist Group (Portuguese: Grupo Comunista Lenin, GCL). In January 1931, the members of the GCL founded the Communist League (Portuguese: Liga Comunista, LC), the Brazilian section of the International Left Opposition. A few years later, on May 1, 1934, during the Labor Day rally, held in the city of São Paulo, they then announced their transformation into the (Portuguese: Liga Comunista Internacionalista, LCI), definitively breaking away from the PCB, and starting to work for the formation of the Fourth International in Brazil.

== Bibliography ==
- Castro, Ricardo Figueiredo de (1993). A Oposição de Esquerda brasileira (1928-1934) : teoria e práxis (Master's) (in Portuguese). Niterói: Universidade Federal Fluminense.
- Marques Neto, Jose Castilho (1993). Solidão Revolucionária. Mário Pedrosa e as origens do trotskismo no Brasil. São Paulo: Paz e Terra. pp. 108–109. OCLC 683745582.
