= Águeda Sena =

Portuguese dancer and choreographer (1927-2019)

- Born: Maria do Céu Águeda Camacho de Sena Faria de Vasconcelos; 16 June 1927; Lisbon, Portugal
- Died: 15 December 2019 (aged 92); Cascais, Portugal
- Occupation(s): ballet dancer, choreographer, actress, teacher
- Years active: 55
- Spouse: Fernando Lima
- Parent(s): Nazária Celsa Camacho Quiroga de Vasconcelos and António d'Azevedo Sena Belo Faria de Vasconcelos,
- Awards: Commander of the Order of Prince Henry ComIH

Maria do Céu Águeda Camacho de Sena Faria de Vasconcelos ComIH (1927 — 2019), better known as Águeda Sena, was a distinguished Portuguese ballet dancer and choreographer.

== Early life and training ==
Sena was born on 16 June 1927 in Lisbon, the capital of Portugal. She was the daughter of a Bolivian mother, Nazária Celsa Camacho Quiroga de Vasconcelos (known as Celsa Camacho), and of António d'Azevedo Sena Belo Faria de Vasconcelos, who was a pedagogue and writer, and a professor of Portuguese at the Faculty of Arts of the University of Lisbon, the Rousseau Institute in Geneva and elsewhere.

At the age of four, she began learning rhythmic dance with a Greek teacher based in Portugal, with whom she studied until the age of eight, performing on stage for the first time, in a show by her teacher at Lisbon's D. Maria II National Theatre in 1932. At around the age of 12, she began studying classical dance at the school of Margarida de Abreu. She participated, initially under the name Maria do Céu Vasconcelos, in several of the school's shows including in the Tardes Literárias (Literary afternoons) at the Teatro São Luiz in Lisbon, as well as in opera shows at the Teatro Nacional de São Carlos and at the Coliseu dos Recreios. In 1947 and 1948 she was Abreu's teaching assistant, while, at the same time, following courses at the Lisbon National Conservatory. There she studied dance, again with Abreu, and theatre with Alves da Cunha and Maria Matos, as well as taking private violin lessons from Gonçalves Pereira. She finished her course at the Conservatory with a high score and then passed the entrance audition at the D. Maria II National Theatre, which entitled her to be granted a Professional Actress/Dancer Licence.

The Círculo de Iniciação Coreográfica (CIC - Choreographic Initiation Circle) had been founded by Abreu in 1945. Sena immediately showed herself to be one of the CIC's most promising members, starting by joining the corps de ballet and then dancing solo roles. She made repeated trips between 1948 and 1953 to Paris, with a scholarship from Portugal's Institute of High Culture, studying classical dance with teachers such as Olga Preobrajenska, Rousanne Sarkissian (Madame Rousanne) and Lubov Egorova. Paris provided her with her first contacts with modern dance when she studied with the company of the American choreographer Katherine Dunham, then on tour in Europe. Together with her Portuguese colleague, Luisa Vitorino, also a former student of Abreu, she was part of the cast of the Katherine Dunham Company for a few months. In Paris, she attended a course on pedagogy at the Sorbonne University and a night course in art history at the Louvre. She also established contacts with important people in the French theatre, such as Jean-Louis Barrault and Jean Vilar.

Sena danced the Waltz and the Prelude of Les Sylphides by Sergei Diaghilev in 1950 in Paris, in a show directed by Jean Guélis. In 1952 she danced the solo Les Mains, written by him, as a soloist in the company Galas de Danse. In 1953 she attended a summer course for ballet teachers at the Sadler's Wells Theatre Ballet in London, where she also took private lessons, before performing at the Sadler’s Wells Theatre.

== Career ==
At the beginning of 1954, Sena fell seriously ill with tuberculosis and remained hospitalized for almost a year and a half in London hospitals, mainly the Royal Brompton Hospital, only returning to Lisbon in May 1955. After a quick period of convalescence, Sena married Fernando Lima, and began dancing again alongside him in Vasco Morgado's "musical super-fantasy", "Melodies of Lisbon" and, later, in the "Ballet-Concerto" group that debuted on 29 November 1955. Then, with the group "Dances and Songs of Portugal – Portuguese Ballets", she performed in the Cine-Teatro Monumental, Lisbon, at the Casino Estoril and then on a European tour. In Annecy in France, the group performed a series of shows with Edith Piaf.

After returning from abroad, she participated in a revue at the Monumental, in 1956, and in two plays, starring Laura Alves and Artur Semedo, again working for the impresario Vasco Morgado. Sena, at that time, became popular, above all for playing the role of Severa, in O Fado (The Fado). On 7 March 1957, Sena and Lima participated in the first official television broadcast of Radiotelevisão Portuguesa (RTP), performing the ballet Os Enganos do Amor (The Deceptions of Love), with music by Tchaikovsky.

From then on, Sena and Lima began working regularly on Portuguese television, dancing several ballets choreographed by Lima, as well as part of Les Sylphides. Both also participated in the first television play presented by RTP. In September 1957 they danced in a new revue at the Monumental, entitled Música, Mulheres e... (Music, Women, and...) for which they also did the choreography. In 1960, Sena participated in the "Blue Bird" programme, to present art to children from poor backgrounds in Lisbon. In this "children's arts academy", under the guidance of the poet Fernanda de Castro, director of Children's Parks in Lisbon, Sena was in charge of teaching dance for two and a half years.

When the Grupo Experimental de Ballet (GEB) was formed, Sena participated, as a choreographer, in its first show in May 1961 in Porto in Pastorale by Igor Stravinsky, which was also performed in Aveiro, Lisbon, Guimarães and Viseu. In 1961-62 she choreographed works by 19 Portuguese poets, including Fernando Pessoa, Cesário Verde, Herberto Helder, Mário de Sá-Carneiro, Bernardim Ribeiro, Camilo Pessanha, and Sebastião da Gama. A remarkable work, which was premiered on 24 May 1963 by the GEB, with music by Dmitri Shostakovitch, was O Crime da Aldeia Velha (The Crime of the Old Village). This was presented in several Portuguese cities.

At the beginning of 1964, Sena participated as a dancer and choreographer in the show "Three Modes of Poetry", a project by the Teatro de Câmara António Ferro, founded by Ferro's widow, Fernanda de Castro. This was first performed at the Teatro Tivoli in Lisbon and involved several important Portuguese poets. Sena then embarked on another project, alongside Norman Dixon, former ballet master and choreographer at GEB, in a show entitled "Homage to William Shakespeare". From then on, she gradually stopped performing on stage as a dancer to pursue choreography, dance teaching and acting. In 1965 she enjoyed enormous success as choreographer of the revue Esta Lisboa que eu Amo (This Lisbon I Love), at the Monumental.

In 1967 Sena returned to the former GEB, then renamed as the Gulbenkian Ballet Group (GGB), under the direction of Walter Gore, to recreate O Crime da Aldeia Velha for two shows at the Tivoli. In February 1968, GGB premiered another work by Sena, "Judas", at Teatro Politeama. In the same year she choreographed "Don Quixote", which was performed in Madrid in April. She choreographed "Blood Wedding" and "The Police Commissioner" in 1968 and "Ancestors, Sold" in 1970. The following year she was responsible for the choreography of Tempos Modernos (Modern Times) at the Politeama, and "Concerto" (with music by Chopin), at the Gulbenkian Foundation's Grand Auditorium.

At the Expo '70 world exhibition, in Osaka, Japan, Sena had what she considered to be "the greatest triumph of her career" in presenting Namban Matsuri, a multidisciplinary show performed by two dance companies, several actors and a musical group, and involving more than 200 Portuguese performers in a Portuguese-Japanese co-production. On returning to Lisbon, she attempted to put on a scaled-down version of the show without success. This she attributed to the fact that Portugal's Estado Novo dictatorship did not look favourably on such a powerful work.

After the Japanese experience, Sena started to collaborate regularly, both as an actress and choreographer, with the Teatro Experimental de Cascais (TEC), particularly in productions by Carlos Avilez. In 1971 she was invited to put on, in Norway, a show composed of short plays by the French playwright, poet and musician Jean Tardieu. As a fellow of the Calouste Gulbenkian Foundation, she went to Copenhagen in Denmark, where she won a prize for children's theatre. Her last work for the Gulbenkian Foundation was in 1975. She also worked on several films.

In 1979 she received professional certification as an international theatre and dance teacher, having taught in Berlin, Leipzig and Dresden. That same year she taught at the Macau Cultural Institute and directed a Portuguese-Chinese show based on texts by Gil Vicente. Between 1989 and 1994 she held a teaching position at the Lisbon Theatre and Film School and, between September 1998 and January 2000, she also taught at the TEC school.

== Death ==
Sena died of cancer in Cascais on 15 December 2019 after a long illness. In her later years she had serious vision problems and lived in a nursing home. She was buried at the Alcabideche cemetery.

== Awards and distinctions ==
In 1962 Sena won, together with dancers Isabel Santa Rosa and Armando Jorge, the Bordalo Prize in the Ballet category for her choreography. At Expo '70 her show, Namban Matsuri was considered the best show at the exhibition. In 1994 she was made a Commander of the Order of Prince Henry. In 1996 she was made an honorary citizen of Cascais, while in 2005 she was awarded the Medal of Honour of the Portuguese Society of Authors.

Sena appears on a 2015 Portuguese €0.72 postage stamp.
