= First Brazilian Workers' Congress =

1906 workers meeting

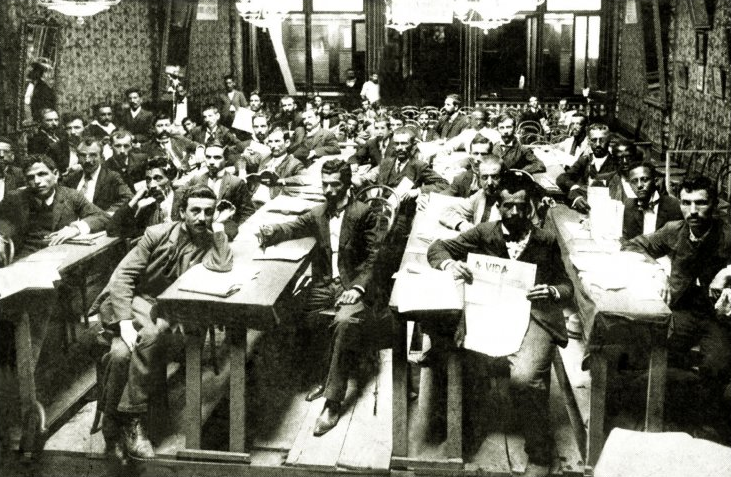
- Delegates gathered during one of the Congress sessions
- Native name: Primeiro Congresso Operário Brasileiro
- Date: 15–22 April 1906
- Venue: Centro Galego Headquarters
- Location: Federal Capital, Brazil
- Type: Congress
- Motive: Syndicalism
- Participants: Brazilian trade unions
- Outcome: Foundation of the Brazilian Workers' Confederation

The First Brazilian Workers' Congress was a meeting of workers that took place between 15 and 22 April 1906 at the headquarters of Centro Galego, in Rio de Janeiro, then the Federal Capital of Brazil. The Congress was the first initiative in the sense of organizing the working class at a national level in Brazil, and was attended by 43 delegates representing 28 workers unions from different parts of the country, but mainly from the states of Rio de Janeiro and São Paulo. The congressional resolutions showed an evident influence of revolutionary syndicalism among the delegates present, who endorsed the political neutrality of the unions, federalism, direct action and the general strike. The Congress also laid the foundations for the agreement of the Brazilian Workers' Confederation, the first union institution of national scope, but which would only begin its activities in 1908.

== Background ==
The period comprised by the First Brazilian Republic was marked by the consolidation of the working class in Brazil, started in the mid-nineteenth century from common experiences lived by enslaved and free workers. The abolition of slavery, in 1888, and the Proclamation of the Republic, in 1889, opened a horizon of expectations for the nascent working class, but the following years made clear the limitations of the republican regime, fostering new ideas and perspectives of organization and struggle. Thus, workers initially involved in the republican movement adhered to other political projects, such as anarchism and socialism. According to John W. F. Dulles, anarchists and socialists "advocated shoulder to shoulder in the main mission of persuading workers to join labor associations", but held divergent perspectives on workers' organization and struggle. The anarchists proposed a direct action unionism, rejecting the party organization and the participation of the working class in institutional politics, defending the strike as the main form of struggle and denying the intermediation of the State in the conflicts between capital and work. The socialists, in turn, supported an openly reformist perspective: they classified the strike as a form of struggle valid only in extreme cases and defended the consolidation of the gains obtained by the labor movement through the approval of laws. Unlike the anarchists, they did not refuse the authorities to mediate in labor conflicts and encouraged the participation of workers in institutional politics, supporting or presenting candidates for legislative elections.

The awareness of the limits of the republican order and the emergence of new ideologies in the working class added to the increase in strike agitation. According to historian Claudio Batalha, the early years of the 20th century brought together favorable conditions for the emergence of movements to demand the working class in Brazil: the expansion of the economy that began in 1903 created a more favorable conjuncture for obtaining gains and there was a growth of the workers and unions organization. Initially, most strikes were quite circumscribed, often limited to a single company or workshop. However, larger movements soon took place, involving entire sectors or even several different categories, such as the general strike of 1903 in Rio de Janeiro, initiated by textiles workers and which had the adhesion of thousands of workers from other branches. Despite the growth of strike movements, Dulles noted that the successes achieved before the 1908 economic recession "were hard to achieve", with a large number of unsuccessful strikes indicating "the need for better organization". Thus, workers' leaders spent the years 1904 and 1905 fighting for the formation of new class entities and "educating the workers in meetings". The 1903 general strike itself was harshly repressed and none of its demands were met, but it ended up laying the foundations for a unionism more based on direct action in Rio de Janeiro. A month after that strike, the Federation of Class Associations was founded, succeeded by the Brazilian Regional Workers Federation (FORB) in 1905. Also in 1905, the São Paulo Workers' Federation (FOSP) was founded in São Paulo, after a series of labor mobilizations that had already taken place since 1901. The increase in the number of workers' associations and federations ended up motivating an initiative to try to articulate the working class at the national level, culminating in the organization of the First Brazilian Workers' Congress. At the time, the division between reformists (socialists) and revolutionaries (anarchists) was also already consolidated, and since its convening the meeting was marked by the clash between these two conceptions.

== Call and organization ==
The idea of organizing a congress that would bring together union representatives from all over the country seems to have come from Antônio Pinto Machado, leader of the Workers' Union of Engenho de Dentro. A Union circular signed by him was published in the newspaper Correio da Manhã in December 1905, calling for a workers' congress. According to the circular, the congress should discuss "whether the worker should be a politician or not, and which policy to accept", and only the presence of socialists would be admitted, "revolutionary elements being prohibited". Considering that the call for the Union took the side of a specific political tendency, FORB began to organize its own congress, arguing that it would be necessary to hold a workers' meeting to deal with exclusively economic issues. In April 1906, a circular signed by Alfredo Vasques, secretary of the Federation, called on workers to attend the "1st Brazilian Regional Workers' Congress":

Interpreting the famous maxim that the emancipation of workers will be the work of the workers themselves, this Federation decided to celebrate the "1st Brazilian Regional Workers' Congress", whose sessions will start on the 15th of this current [month], at 8 am, in the halls of the "Centro Galego", at Rua da Constituição, 30 and 32.

This Congress will discuss the means that the organized working class should adopt to achieve the improvements it so desperately needs, and which no one is more interested in achieving than the working class itself; because no one can do it for them.

The workers who organized the current congress, convinced that only with the cooperation of the greatest number, through the efforts of those interested, can the resolutions taken therein be put into practice, invite the workers to participate, en masse, in its sessions, so that they are aware of the deliberations taken by the delegates who are all workers and, therefore, guided solely by the aspiration to free labor from the capitalist monopoly.

Comrades, do not deny your solidarity! Attend the "1st Brazilian Regional Labor Congress".

Pinto Machado initially accused the Federation of imitating his initiative, but his call had few adhesions and he ended up accrediting the Union to participate in the congress organized by FORB.

== Delegates sent to the congress ==
The First Brazilian Workers' Congress took place between the 15 and 22 April 1906 at the headquarters of Centro Galego, in Rio de Janeiro, then Federal Capital of Brazil, and was attended by 43 delegates representing 28 associations from different parts of the country, but mainly from Rio de Janeiro and São Paulo. The organizations represented and their delegates were the following: Quarry Workers Union, Antônio da Silva Barão and Marcelino da Costa Ramos; Artistic Center of Ceará, Antônio Pinto Machado and Benjamin Prins; Union of Graphic Workers of São Paulo, Eduardo Vassimon and Augusto dos Santos Altro; Protective Center for Workers of Pernambuco, José Hermes de Olinda Costa; Association of Coal and Mineral Workers, Belisário Pereira de Sousa and Firmino Rodrigues Alonso; Marmorist Workers Center, José de Sousa Azevedo and João Arzua dos Santos; Union of Longshoremen, Manuel dos Santos Valença and Manuel Inácio de Araújo; Workers Union of Engenho de Dentro, Benjamin Moisés Prins and José Roberto Vieira de Melo; Railway Employees Center, Domingos Gomes Sobrinho and Francisco Camilo Soares; Hatters Union, José Arnaldo de Carvalho and Antônio Pires G. Sola; Couriers and Correlative Arts Union, Félix Alesandre Pinho and Auto Navarro Negreiros; Italian Workers' League, Pietro Bernarducci and Silvio Pazzagia; Workers' Federation of São Paulo, representing six unions, Fernanco Frejeiro, Manuel Domingues de Almeida, Giulio Sorelli, Edgard Leuenroth, Ulysses Martins, Caralampio Trillas, Carlos Dias, Manuel Moscoso, Fernando Bondad and José Sarmento; Tailor Artists League, Cândido Costa and Alfredo Vasques; Union of Carpenters and Correlative Arts, João Benvenuto and Manuel dos Passos do Nascimento Bahia; Union of Tobacco Handlers, Melchior Pereira Cardoso and Mariano Garcia; Association of Workers in Trapiche and Café, Francisco Guilherme Chaves and Anselmo Rosa; Botanical Garden Workers Center, Albino Moreira and Antônio Domingues; Labor Union of Ribeirão Preto, Manuel Ferreira Moreira and Arnaldo José Carvalho; Campinas Workers' League, Alfredo Vasques and Antônio Augusto do Amaral Chaves; Graphic Arts League, Luigi Magrassi and Mota Assunção; Union of Artists Shoemakers, Célio de Brito and Vitorino Pereira; Campos Workers Center, Damazio Gomes da Silva.

== Themes and resolutions ==
=== Guidance ===
The first topic discussed by the Congress was the one that most polarized reformers and revolutionaries: "Should working-class society adhere to a party policy or maintain its neutrality? Should it exercise political action?" Discussions were dominated by FOSP delegates, who energetically fought the reformists' proposals. Anarchist Carlos Dias stated that the political struggle should not be accepted by the workers' movement, "because it is not in agreement with the working class in general. The workers' conquest [...] must be the worker's own. There can be no barrier between capital and labor. [...] No political struggle. No parliament. Only the economic issue". Pinto Machado, on the other hand, took a position in favor of the participation of workers in politics, stating that it "could provide great services to the class", citing the example of the União Operária do Engenho de Dentro, which achieved a reduction in working hours through negotiations involving the government — represented by deputy Ricardo de Albuquerque — and the board of the Central do Brasil Railway. After the debate, Edgard Leuenroth made the following motion, which was eventually passed:

Considering that the working class is extremely divided by its political and religious opinions;

That the only solid basis for agreement and action are the economic interests common to the entire working class, those of the clearest and most readily understood;

That all workers, taught by experience and disillusioned with salvation coming from outside their will and action, recognize the unavoidable need for direct economic action of pressure and resistance, without which, even for the most legalists, there is no law that is valid;

The Workers' Congress advises the proletariat to organize itself into societies of economic resistance, an essential grouping, and, without abandoning the defense of the rudimentary political rights needed by economic organizations through direct action, to put outside the union the special political struggle of a party and the rivalries that would result from the adoption, by the resistance association, of a political or religious doctrine, or an electoral program.

According to historian Tiago Bernardon de Oliveira, this resolution was a victory for the anarchists, "insofar as it attacked the pretensions of influential militant reformists in the Brazilian labor movement". The defense of the political and religious neutrality of the unions appeared to anarchists as "an adequate tactical solution to prevent their instrumentalization by opponents", which allowed the action and participation of libertarian militants in the associative life of workers, contributing to making the unions "revolutionary means".

In the discussion on how Workers' Day, on 1 May, should be celebrated, the delegates present stated that it should be a day of mourning, not a day of celebration. The resolution passed by the Congress recalled the historical origins of the date, "which was born from the demand, by direct action, of eight hours of work in North America and the sacrifice of the innocent victims from Chicago", condemning "indignantly the antics made on the 1st of May with the concurrence and complacency of the gentlemen" and urging the working class "to restore to the 1st of May the character it deserves, of serene, but fearless protest, and of energetic demand for offended or ignored rights". The resolution also recommended "strongly workers' organizations to propagate claims to assert the 1st of May" and welcomed the French labor movement, considered a "model of activity and initiative for workers in Brazil". By mentioning the martyrs of Chicago and the working class of France, the workers gathered in Congress revealed that they felt part of an international trade union movement.

=== Organization ===
When discussing the model to be adopted by the workers' organization, the first question posed was whether the unions should have resistance as their sole purpose or whether they should jointly accept unemployment, illness or mutual aid allowances. Mutualism was generally opposed, but found supporters among the reformist delegates. João Benvenuto considered it "reasonable to have a charity fund, for first aid"; Cândido Costa understood that it was "more plausible to benefit one's comrades than to resort to the bourgeoisie, who exploit everything", but that resistance societies should be "mutual and against capital"; Pinto Machado declared himself against subsidies, but proposed that "a more expedited means of providing emergency services to the unfortunate who, driven by overwork or something similar, found themselves in the impotence of the struggle for life" be discussed. The anarchists Eduardo Vassimon and Luigi Magrassi argued that charitable works should be excluded from the unions, above all "for attacking the effects instead of attacking the cause", generating expenses in "large sums of aid to the sick and victims of disaster" but without trying to "improve the hygienic conditions of the workshops and oblige the bosses to help their workers, who generally contract diseases and become useless at work". The Congress decided that "resistance to employers is the essential action, and that, without it, any work of charity, mutualism, or cooperativism would be entirely the responsibility of the working class, making it easier even for the boss to impose his conditions", also stating that "These secondary works, although bringing to the union a large number of adherents, almost always without initiative and without a spirit of resistance, often serve to embarrass the action of society that completely lacks the purpose for which it was constituted - resistance", recommending that workers' associations should have resistance as their sole purpose.

In deciding whether unions should be organized by profession, industries, or varied professions, the Congress took into account the diverse conditions of the working class and industry and advised:

The union covering all professions, in large industries or companies – when these are directly linked together under the same administration;

The trade union, in isolated and independent professions;

The industry union, when several professions are closely linked or annexed in the same industry;

The union of various professions, only as a last resort and with the aim of facilitating and provoking the formation of other resistance associations.

Without further controversy, the delegates present expressed their preference for federalism, the "only method of organization compatible with the irrepressible spirit of freedom and with the imperious needs of action and workers' education", guaranteeing "the widest autonomy of the individual in the union, of the union in the federation and of the federation in the confederation" and admitting only "simple delegations of function without authority". Thus, the Congress decided that the unions should replace the directors with administrative committees and avoid the existence of paid employees, "except in cases where the large accumulation of service requires that a worker be entirely devoted to it, and should not, however, receive a salary higher than the normal salary for the profession to which he belongs". Considering that "workers' issues can only be frankly resolved by the interested parties themselves, free from the influence of alien interests and the suggestions of strangers", the delegates also decided that employers, foremen and non-workers could not participate in the unions.

=== Workers' action ===
When discussing what would be the means of struggle that the working class should adopt, the Congress witnessed new clashes between revolutionaries and reformists. The anarchists evoked constant references to the French labor movement, emphatically defending the use of strikes and direct action. Vassimon recommended the adoption of the "partial strike, which demonstrates good results, citing [...] the Lièges strike" and the "general strike, if conditions require", although he recognized that repression became more justified in these cases, he recognized that the strike, boycott and sabotage were "the consequence of the struggle, provoked by the bosses". In the same vein, Manuel Moscoso stated that the working class should employ "the partial strike, which, depending on the leadership of the struggle and the needs of the moment, could become general; the boycott, which consists in the workers and the general public do not buy products from the bosses against whom the workers are fighting; sabotage, which consists in destroying the work tools of the bosses who do not accede to the workers' petitions". Reformists took more cautious positions. Pinto Machado stated that the strike was "a double-edged sword", recognizing that "in the last cases, it is the only thing that the worker has in his favor", but he also saw it as potentially harmful, insofar as it could bring unhappiness to workers' homes. The resolution passed was in line with the anarchist positions, arguing that "the economically organized proletariat independent of political parties" could only "make use of the means of action that are its own" and advising "a general or partial strike, boycott, sabotage, public demonstrations, etc." As means of union action propaganda and organization, the Congress recommended the "newspaper, pamphlets, posters, manifestos, stamps, conferences, propaganda tours, theatrical performances and the creation of libraries".

The fight for salary raises was passed over in favor of reducing the working day, on the grounds that "the reduction of hours [...] influences the need for well-being, increasing consumption and hence production". Delegates argued that by "reducing daily work, unemployment will decrease and wages will tend to rise", stating that "the salary increase is yet another consequence, an effect of the reduction of working hours, less unemployment and better be relative rather than a cause of them". The struggle to reduce working hours was reiterated in another resolution of the Congress, which recommended organizations "to undertake an active propaganda in favor of eight hours, without reducing wages, following the salutary example of the proletariat of other countries, today in agitation ". The same resolution also urged "the proletariat to propagandize and protest against war, as well as militarism and against the intervention of the armed forces in disputes between workers and employers; as well as to send, in accordance with the method followed by the French comrades, the greater efforts so that the working class of Brazil, on 1 May 1907, impose eight hours of work".

Congress also recommended that workers not be subject to fines; in the event of restrictions on assembly rights, it advised the working class to put in place "the most effective means" to force the government "to respect these rights, acting, in extreme cases, even with the greatest violence"; it maintained that the unions should maintain secular schools, since "official education is intended to instill in students ideas and feelings aimed at strengthening bourgeois institutions" and "contrary to the aspirations of workers' emancipation"; that in the case of accidents at work, the union should arbitrate compensation and force the employer to pay, "forcing him to do so by direct action"; that workers should demand weekly payment and that in the event of company bankruptcy, they should "use all means, including the courts"; that unions should undertake a "strong campaign against alcoholism", considered "one of the most ingrained vices within the working classes, and which has been an obstacle to their organization"; that it was necessary to organize working women, making them "companions in the struggle"; advised workers not to send their children to workshops or factories; stated that workers should fight to stop rents from rising and reject piecework, "which is always detrimental to the general interests of all workers".

=== Accessory or supplementary issues ===
The delegates present also approved specific resolutions on the situation of rural workers and settlers, miners and civil servants, as well as a resolution on industry federations and another on the use of honorary titles and distinctions within workers' associations. Regarding rural workers and settlers, the Congress stated that urban workers should promote propaganda and make "every effort to organize farm workers into a resistance union, promoting among them the widest emancipatory propaganda", also initiating an "active campaign against the arrogance of which the settlers are victims". Regarding the miners, a resolution was approved recognizing the "sad misery in which the Morro Velho miners find themselves, whose association, Junta Auxiliar dos Operários, is not based on resistance", so that the delegates present recommended the organization of these workers in a union. Regarding civil servants, it was stated "that the law that establishes the maximum working hours of eight hours a day for workers dependent on the State is only partially complied with", recommending that State workers proceed in accordance with the other resolutions adopted by the Congress. The delegates present also considered necessary "the immediate organization of a maritime federation among seafarers" and a federation of civil construction workers, and advised the workers' organizations "not to allow any sort of honorary distinction within their midst, seeking to make evident and practical its ideal of social equality".

=== Basis of agreement for the Brazilian Workers' Confederation ===
The Congress also laid the foundations for the Brazilian Workers' Confederation (COB), a national union institution that should promote "the union of wage workers to defend their moral and material, economic and professional interests"; to strengthen "the bonds of solidarity between the organized proletariat, giving strength and cohesion to their efforts and demands"; to study and propagate "the means of emancipation of the proletariat and to defend in public the economic demands of the workers" and to gather and publish "statistical data and accurate information on the labor movement and working conditions throughout the country". In line with the resolutions passed in Congress, the COB would adopt a federalist organizational model and would be formed by national industry or craft federations, local or state unions of unions and isolated unions in places where there were no local, state, industry or craft federations. Each adhering organization would have "one delegate for each union in the Confederal Commission". Only unions "exclusively formed by wage workers and whose main basis is resistance" could be part of the Confederation, which would not belong "to any political school or religious doctrine". COB would also be responsible for publishing the newspaper A Voz do Trabalhador and its Confederal Commission would be in charge of organizing future congresses. Although the creation of the COB was decided in Congress, it was effectively structured only in 1908.
