= Teatro Experimental de Cascais =

Theatre company in Portugal (founded 1965)

- Interactive map of Teatro Experimental de Cascais
- Address: Teatro Municipal Mirita Casimiro, Av. Fausto de Figueiredo; Estoril; Portugal
- Coordinates: 38°42′27″N 09°24′13″W

Construction
- Opened: November 1965

The Teatro Experimental de Cascais (Cascais Experimental Theatre – TEC) is a theatre company based in the Cascais municipality in the Lisbon District of Portugal. It was founded in November 1965 and has focused on exploration and experimentation, presenting plays by a long list of authors, both foreign and Portuguese. In addition to members of the company, it works with external designers and technicians, directors, visual artists, and composers, as well as numerous actors and actresses who, in some cases, began their careers at the TEC. Originally hosted by the Teatro Gil Vicente, Cascais, it now performs at the Teatro Municipal Mirita Casimiro in Estoril. The company has received many awards and has participated in festivals around the world. It maintains a museum in Cascais, in which visitors can learn about the company's history through photographs, booklets, texts, set models, props, and mannequins wearing costumes, and other items and also operates the Cascais Professional Theatre School (EPTC).

== History ==
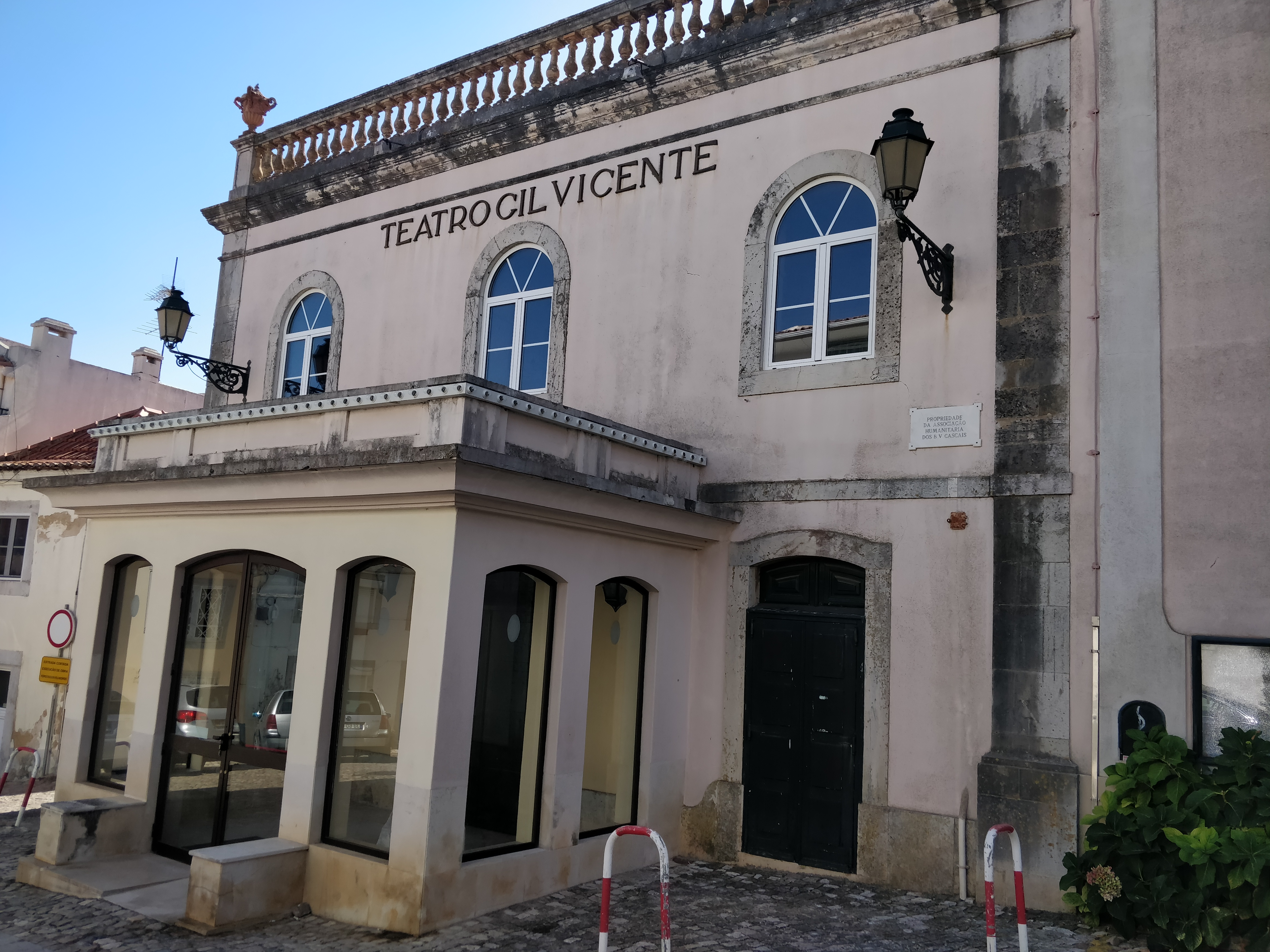
Gil Vicente Theatre, Cascais

TEC's history overlaps with that of the actor and director, Carlos Avilez. In 1965, he learnt that the Gil Vicente theatre in Cascais was vacant. Shortly thereafter, he established TEC, which became the first professional theatre company in Portugal to work outside Lisbon and Porto. Its first performance was of Life of Aesop by the Brazilian-Portuguese dramatist, António José da Silva, which Avilez had been rehearsing in Lisbon when he learnt of the availability of the Gil Vicente. In the company's early years censorship issues were a daily problem under the authoritarian Estado Novo government and in 1970 the TEC was restricted to only performing shows in Cascais. Avilez's plays were controversial because they broke with the conventional theatre being performed at the time. The actress Glicínia Quartin spent almost two years waiting for the censors to approve the staging of The Maids by Jean Genet, and at the dress rehearsal "twelve men with blue pencils attended". Another playwright to cause the Estado Novo censors difficulties was the Pole, Witold Gombrowicz.

Following the Carnation Revolution overthrow of the Estado Novo, the TEC was gradually given more freedom and began to tour, including overseas. However, for a short period after the revolution the company, which had a reputation of fighting against the Estado Novo, was sidelined and even accused of collaborationism and this was a factor in its departure from the Teatro Gil Vicente, being evicted while the company was on tour in Mozambique.

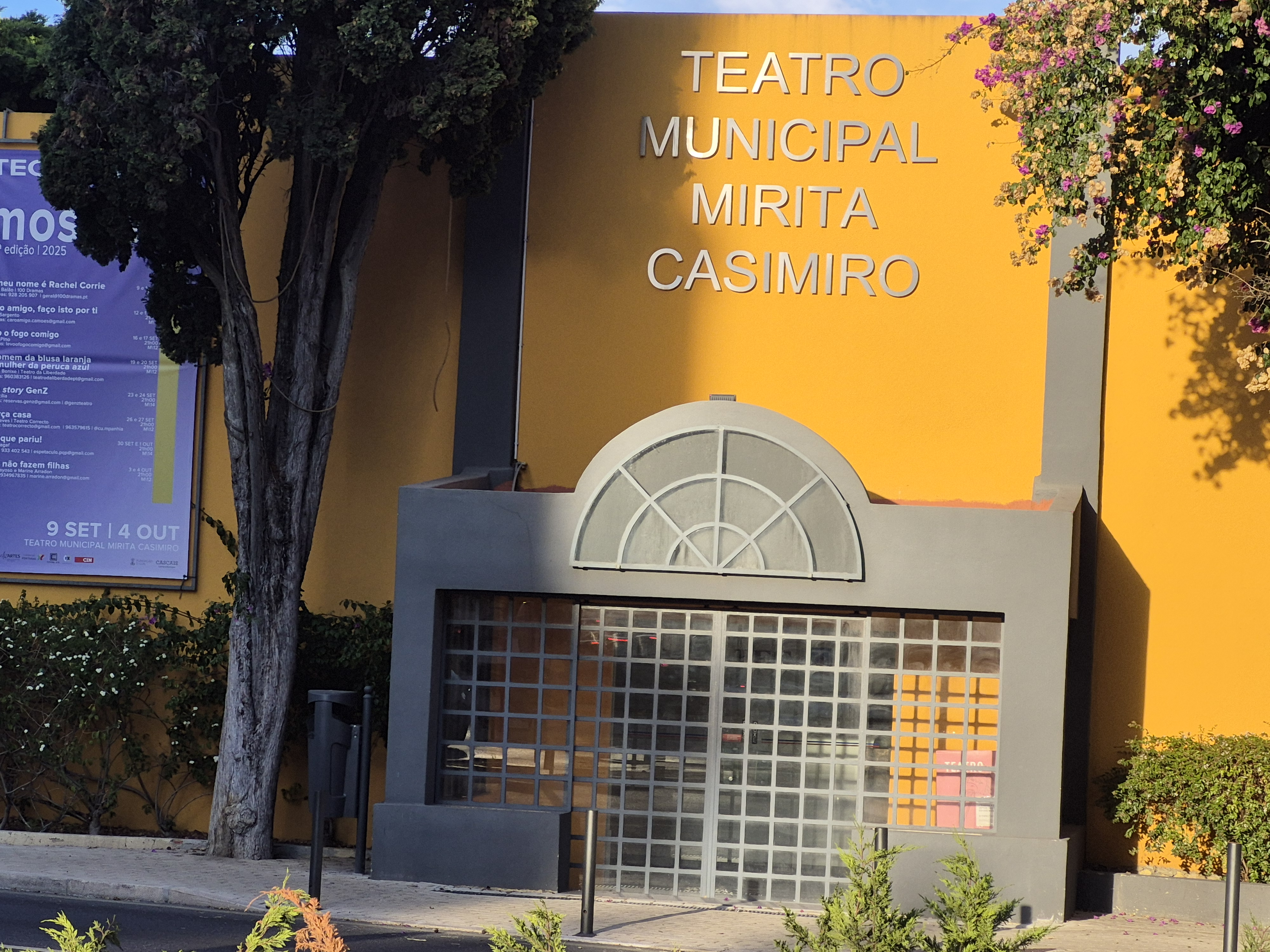
Teatro Municipal Mirita Casimiro in Monte Estoril

== Move to Estoril ==
In 1979 the Cascais Municipality ceded the Teatro Municipal Mirita Casimiro in Monte Estoril to TEC, although works to adapt the space meant that the official opening did not take place until 1986. The theatre was named after the singer and actress Mirita Casimiro, who had done much to contribute to the early success of the company. This was followed by a period of consolidation of the group's repertoire, including shows that had been previously well received, such as Genet's The Balcony, Bertolt Brecht's Life of Galileo and William Shakespeare's King Lear.

Those who have performed with the TEC have included Mário Viegas, Diogo Infante, and Alexandra Lencastre, who all had their first professional experiences with the company, as well as Amélia Rey Colaço and Eunice Muñoz. In addition to Avilez, directors who have worked with the company have included Águeda Sena and Jorge Listopad. These and others were able to count on the design and artistic skills of artists such as Almada Negreiros, Júlio Resende, João Vieira, and Graça Morais as well as composers and musicians such as Carlos Paredes, António Victorino de Almeida, Carlos Zíngaro, and the Delfins.

For its fortieth anniversary in 2005, the TEC premiered René de Obaldia's Du vent dans les branches de sassafras (The Wind in the Branches of Sassafraz). The play was translated by the writer and social activist, Natália Correia, and directed by Avilez. For its 60th anniversary in 2025 it performed Shakespeare's The Taming of the Shrew.

== Travels ==
The TEC's work has been recognized multiple times with awards, both for the company and for individual actors. The company has performed at the 11th Latin Theatre Cycle in Barcelona, at the Denver International Festival, at the 5th International Theatre Meetings for Children and Youth in Lyon, at the 7th International Theatre Festival for Boys in Turin, at the Montevideo International Festival, (Uruguay), at the Spring Festival in Budapest, and at the 10th Bayonne Theatre Festival. It has also toured in the USA, Brazil, Spain, France, Japan, Angola, Mozambique, Italy, Uruguay, and Hungary.

== Other activities ==
An important aspect of the company's work is to encourage young people to become engaged in the theatre. It has worked with Cascais Municipality on a project "The Student, the Teacher, the Theatre and the School". Since 2004, it has also had a museum, or Espaço Memória (Memory Space), with a collection of costumes, props, etc. from past performances and occasionally holds specific exhibitions relating to past shows. TEC also operates the Cascais Professional Theatre School (EPTC).
