= Fernanda de Castro =

Portuguese writer, poet and social worker (1900–1994)

- Born: Maria Fernanda Teles de Castro de Quadros; 9 December 1900; Lisbon, Portugal
- Died: 19 December 1994 (aged 94); Lisbon, Portugal
- Occupations: Poet, writer, playwright, social worker
- Years active: 75
- Spouse: António Ferro
- Awards: Military Order of Saint James of the Sword

Maria Fernanda Teles de Castro de Quadros Ferro OSE (9 December 1900 – 19 December 1994) was a Portuguese writer, poet, and translator. She was founder and director of the National Association of Children's Parks and of the magazine Bem Viver. She also wrote music for fado, marches and children's songs, as well as screenplays for film and ballet.

== Early life ==
Fernanda de Castro was the daughter of João Filipe das Dores de Quadros who had family ties with the former Portuguese colony of Goa and Ana Isaura Codina Teles de Castro da Silva. She had four brothers and one sister. She was born close to midnight in the Campo de Ourique area of the Portuguese capital of Lisbon, according to her mother on 8 December 1900 and according to her father and official documents on the 9th. Christened Maria Fernanda, she was nicknamed Mariazinha (Little Maria), a name she would later use for one of her children's books, Mariazinha em África.

In 1909 her father became captain of the port of Portimão in the Algarve, where she went to school. He would later transfer to Figueira da Foz. The family then returned to Lisbon before her father was appointed, in 1913, to become port captain at Bolama in Portuguese Guinea. Her mother died of yellow fever in Bolama. Castro married António Ferro in 1922. As he was presenting a play in Brazil at the time and she was in Lisbon, they married by proxy, and she then went to Rio de Janeiro to join her husband. There she had her portrait painted by Tarsila do Amaral and Anita Malfatti, both leading Brazilian artists. The couple had two sons António Quadros and Fernando Manuel de Quadros Ferro, who were both involved in literary activities. The daughter of António, Rita Ferro, also became a well-known writer, playwright, and scriptwriter.

== Career ==
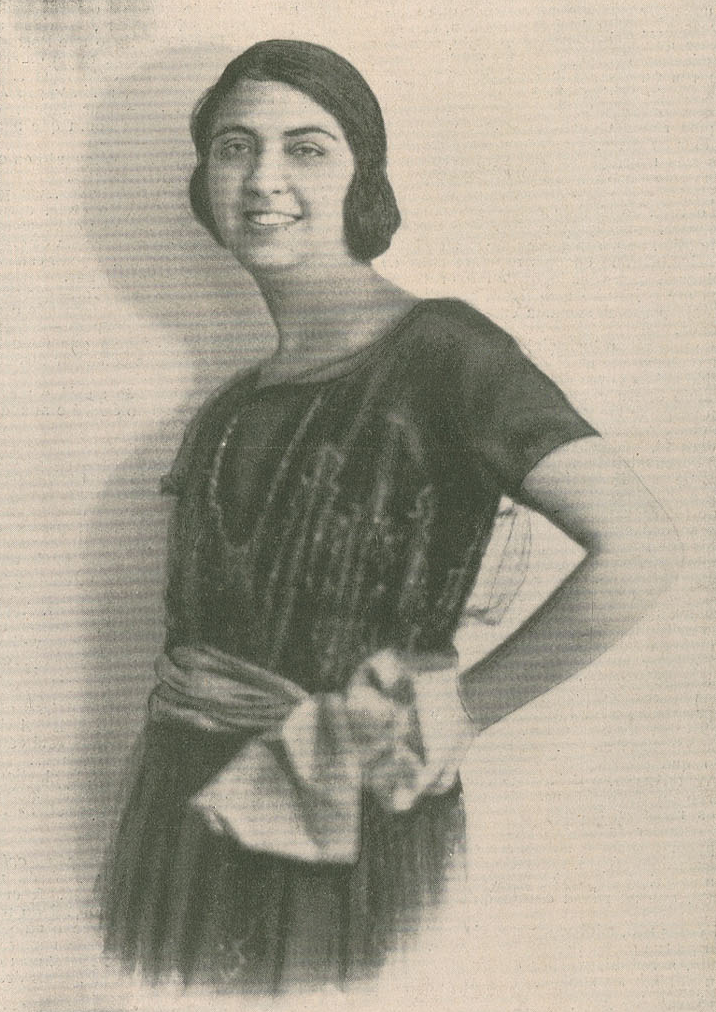
1921 portrait of Castro

Having completed her school studies between 1915 and 1918, majoring in mathematics, Castro began to attend literary salons in 1920, including those given by Veva de Lima. She would spend her Sundays at the home of the writer and poet, Branca de Gonta Colaço. A year later, she gave up attending a Polytechnic School and published her first book, Ante-manhã, containing verses written when she was between 15 and 18. Publication of this book, under the name of Maria Fernanda de Castro e Quadros, was a birthday present from family and friends. She was astonished to find that "my little book was not badly received". She then went on to win first prize in a competition to submit an original play. This was named Náufragos (Castaways) and was written in collaboration with her friend, Teresa Leitão de Barros. It had its first performance in 1924.

On 7 April 1921 she contributed to the first edition of the Diário de Lisboa newspaper, which also included work by her future husband. After this, she began to sign her name as Fernanda de Castro, publishing a second book of poetry called Danças de Roda (Circle Dances). In 1924, she published a book of poems called Cidade em Flor (City in flower), with a cover illustration by Bernardo Marques.

Accompanying her husband and invited by the Brazilian modernist writer Oswald de Andrade and his wife, she then went to Paris, where the two couples were part of the social circle of people such as the artist Francis Picabia, the fashion designer Paul Poiret, and the composers Arthur Honegger and Eric Satie. In 1925, she published her second book of poems, entitled Varinha de Condão (Magic Wand), in collaboration with Teresa Leitão de Barros. She was also translating foreign plays for her husband's new theatre group, which was performing at Lisbon's Teatro da Rua dos Condes. In 1926 she published her first children's books including Mariazinha em África, which became very popular. The first edition had a cover by Sarah Affonso. In 1927 she published As Novas Aventuras de Mariazinha (The new adventures of Mariazinha).

Continuing to publish poetry, in 1928 she also brought out her first novel for adults, O Veneno do Sol (The poison of the sun), set in Africa. In the 1990s, it would be adapted into a soap opera. In 1930, her play Nova Escola de Maridos (New school for husbands) was staged at Lisbon's Teatro da Trindade. In 1931, together with her friend Inês Guerreiro, Castro embarked on social work, establishing the National Association of Children's Parks. These parks, aimed at poorer communities in Lisbon, were colourful places that offered teaching of painting, music and ballet (with Águeda Sena as one of the teachers), a permanent nurse and weekly visits from doctors, as well as food and schooling. She persuaded the banker, Ricardo Espírito Santo, to be the patron, the first park being inaugurated in 1932 and the second in 1934.

Castro assisted her husband to collect exhibits for the Portugal Pavilion at the Paris International Exhibition, held in 1937. She also played an important role in various conferences held at the Pavilion, whose participants included the French novelist, Colette. In 1939 there were Portuguese pavilions at exhibitions in New York City and San Francisco, and Castro also worked with her husband on these. In 1940, she wrote the script for the ballet A Lenda das Amendoeiras (The Legend of the Almond Trees), which was performed at the Teatro da Trindade. In the same year she collaborated with her husband, a supporter and propagandist of the Estado Novo dictatorship, in the presentation of the Portuguese World Exhibition in Lisbon. She then translated El Padre Setubal (Father Setubal) by Maurice Maeterlinck, presented at the D. Maria II National Theatre by Amélia Rey Colaço and Robles Monteiro.

During World War II, Castro published a cookbook, under the pseudonym of Teresa Diniz that recognised the shortages caused by the war as it was entitled One Hundred Recipes Without Meat. In 1944, she translated the Journal of Katherine Mansfield and in 1945 she published the novel, Maria da Lua, for which she became the first woman to win the Ricardo Malheiros Prize, from the Academy of Sciences of Lisbon. In 1946 she translated Letters to a Young Poet by the Austrian writer Rainer Maria Rilke. Others she translated included Luigi Pirandello and Eugène Ionesco. In 1950, her husband was appointed as Portuguese ambassador to Switzerland and Castro accompanied him there, but travelled frequently back to Portugal. In 1953 she launched the magazine Bem Viver (Live Well) and edited it for two years. Her husband was then transferred to Rome. Despite playing the role of the diplomat's wife, she still found time to write new poems and novels.

In November 1956, Castro's husband died in Lisbon after surgery. This left her fairly poor but, even so, she turned down an offer from the Government to receive a salary for running the National Association of Children's Parks. In 1961, her son, Fernando, was seriously injured in a car crash that killed his two daughters. Continuing to write poetry and other literature, in 1964, she published a book for children introducing botany, called É A Vida Maravilhosa das Plantas (It's The Wonderful Life of Plants). In the same year she moved to Faro in the Algarve, where she opened a restaurant and also organised the first Algarve Festival. In 1966 she wrote a major poem, África Raiz, inspired by her time in Africa and subsequent visits. In 1969 she was awarded the National Poetry Prize. The following year she purchased an old house in the hill town of Marvão and restored it. This left her little time to support her children's parks and she transferred the charity to the Santa Casa da Misericórdia, a religious charity.

By 1985 Castro had become bedridden and almost blind. She dictated her memoirs to two friends, Teresa Zeverino and Edith Arvelos. The first volume, Ao Fim da Memória (1906-1939), was published in 1986. The second volume, covering 1939–1987, was published a year later. Her final novel, Everything is Principle, was published posthumously in 2006. She died in Lisbon on 19 December 1994.

== Awards and honours ==
In 1920 she won the D.Maria II National Theatre Award, for the play Náufragos In 1940, Castro was made an Officer of Military Order of Saint James of the Sword. In 1942 she received an award from Romania for her translation work. In 1945 she was the first woman to win the Ricardo Malheiros Prize from the Lisbon Academy of Sciences. Castro won the National Poetry Prize in 1969. In 1990, she was awarded the Children's Literature Prize by the Calouste Gulbenkian Foundation. After her death, the Lisbon City Council gave her name to a garden in the parish of Belém.

== Works ==
- 1919 – Ante-manhã. Lisbon, Edition da Autora.
- 1921 - Danças de roda. Lisbon: Tipografia Lusitânia.
- 1924 - Cidade em flor. Lisbon, Edition da Autora.
- 1924 - Varinha de condão. Lisbon, Edition das Autoras.
- 1925 - Mariazinha em África. Empresa Literária Fluminense Limitada.
- 1928 - Jardim. Lisbon, Edition da Autora.
- 1928 - O veneno do sol. Lisbon, Edition da Autora.
- 1929 - As Aventuras de Mariazinha. Lisbon: Oficina Gráfica, Lda.
- 1932 - O tesouro da Casa Amarela – Teatro Infantil. Lisbon, Empresa Nacional de Publicidade.
- 1935 - Daquém e Dalém Alma. Poems. Lisbon, Editorial Império.
- 1940 (approx.) - 100 Receitas sem carne. Under the pseudonym of Teresa Diniz.
- 1942 - Trinta e nove Poemas. Lisbon, Editorial Império.
- 1943 - A pedra no lago. Lisbon, Edições Ocidente.
- 1945 - Maria da Lua. História de uma casa. Lisbon.
- 1948 - Sorte. Lisbon, Ocidente.
- 1951 - Raiz funda. Lisbon, Edições Bertrand.
- 1952 - Exílio. Lisbon, Livraria Bertrand.
- 1955 - Asa no Espaço. Lisbon, Edições Ática.
- 1962 - A Ilha da Grande Solidão. Lisbon, Portugália Editora.
- 1963 - A Princesa dos Sete Castelos, illustrated by Inês Guerreiro. Lisbon, Tipografia Peres
- 1964 - A Vida Maravilhosa das Plantas, illustrated by Inês Guerreiro. Lisbon, Edition da Autora.
- 1966 - África Raiz, illustrated by Eleutério Sanches. Lisbon, Parceria A. M. Pereira.
- 1969 - Bloco 65, illustrated by Inês Guerreiro. Lisbon.
- 1969 - Fim-de-Semana na Gorongosa. Lisbon, Edition da Autora.
- 1973 - Fontebela. Lisbon, Edition da Autora.
- 1983 - A Ilha dos Papagaios. Lisbon, Editorial Verbo.
- 1986 - Ao Fim da Memória I. Memórias 1906 – 1939 (Autobiography), Lisbon, Editorial Verbo.
- 1987 - Ao Fim da Memória II – Memórias 1939 – 1987. Lisbon, Editorial Verbo.
- 1989 - Urgente. Lisbon, Guimarães Editores.
- 1990 - Cartas para além do tempo. Lisbon, Europres.
- 2006 - Tudo é princípio. Lisbon, Círculo de Leitores.
