= Brazilian Workers' Confederation =

- Confederação Operária Brasileira
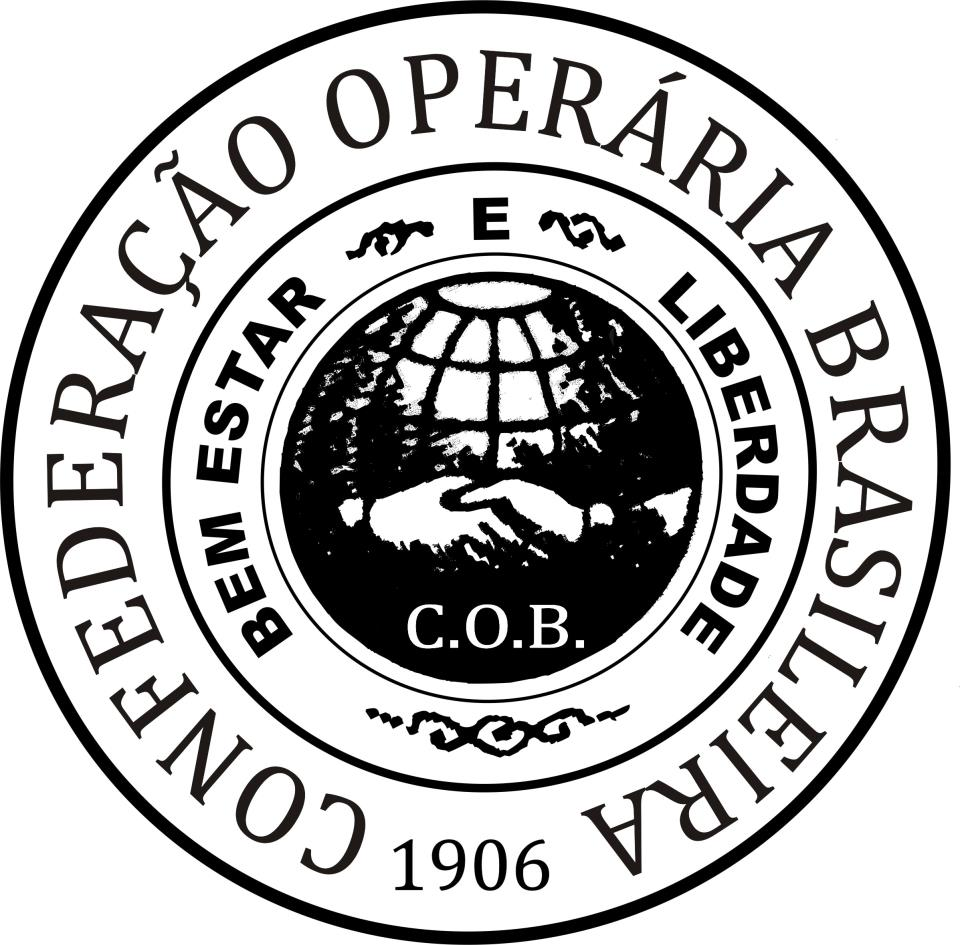
- Seal of the Brazilian Workers' Confederation
- Abbreviation: COB
- Formation: March 1908; 118 years ago
- Dissolved: c. 1915; 111 years ago
- Type: Trade union federation
- Headquarters: rua do Hospício nº 144, Rio de Janeiro
- Main organ: A Voz do Trabalhador

The Brazilian Workers' Confederation (Portuguese: Confederação Operária Brasileira, COB) was the first national trade union center in Brazil, founded in 1908, under the basis of agreement of the First Brazilian Workers' Congress of 1906. Through its newspaper, A Voz do Trabalhador, it allowed a certain coordination and exchange of information within the Brazilian worker movement at the national level. The COB was formed by national industry and craft federations, local and state unions, unions isolated in places where there were no federations and non-federated industries.

During the first years of existence, the COB brought together about 50 unions, especially those organized in the Workers' Federation of Rio de Janeiro (FORJ), in the Workers' Federation of São Paulo (FOSP) and the Workers' Federation of Rio Grande do Sul (FORGS), which were the main support bases of the Confederation, and also those organized in the Bahia Socialist Federation (FSB), in the Local Workers' Federation of Santos (FOLTS), among others.

COB members considered that it should defend the fundamental aspirations of the working class, without distinction of school or party, so that any member of an organization, whether they be social-democratic, socialist, anarchist or another tendency, could accept it entirely. It was considered that the condition for the success of the union was in its autonomy, which would guarantee the suppression of conflicts between the different political trends between the workers.

== History ==
=== Background ===
The first years of the 20th century gathered some conditions favorable to the outbreak of workers' demands in Brazil, with an economic environmental conjuncture to obtain gains, with a phase of expansion of the economy initiated in 1903 and the proliferation of workers' organizations focused on trade unionism. Most strikes in the early 1900s had a very circumscribed character, often limited to a single company. It was from 1903 that the movements began to involve entire sectors and sometimes several different sectors. The textile industry strike in the Federal District in August–September of that year was a milestone in this sense, especially for involving a sector submitted to mechanical work, with considerable presence of women and minors, and that did not have the organizational experience of skilled sectors, which were already organized into mutual associations. Another striking aspect of the strike was receiving the adhesion of other sectors, which gave it characteristics of a general strike, bringing together thousands of workers. The strike was preceded by a series of localized mobilizations that gave rise to the first industrial union of the Federal District, the federation of workers in tissue factories. The strike was harshly repressed and none of its demands were met. Despite the defeat, this movement launched the basis of a trade unionism based more in direct action in Rio de Janeiro. At the time, the stoppage was described as "the most important strike movement hitherto held in Brazil". A month after the strike the Federation of Class Associations was founded in the Federal District. Still in 1905 the Workers' Federation of São Paulo (FOSP) was founded. Both institutions illustrate the increase in the number of workers' associations and federations in the period that preceded the realization of first Brazilian worker Congress.

=== First Brazilian Workers' Congress (1906) ===
In December 1905, with the rise of the worker organizations, the Federation of Class Associations published in the Brazilian Associations Federation a convocation for the First Brazilian Workers' Congress, to be held in the Federal District in 1906. The call explained that "only Socialists take part in the Congress, the revolutionary elements are forbidden," since beside the intention to create the "General Union of Workers in Brazil, or any other that is chosen", it would be discussed "if the worker must or must not be political." The explicit repulsion to the revolutionary elements manifested tensions between the anarchist and socialist currents, which focused on the Brazilian labor movement at that time. In any case, the anarchists were still present at the Congress.

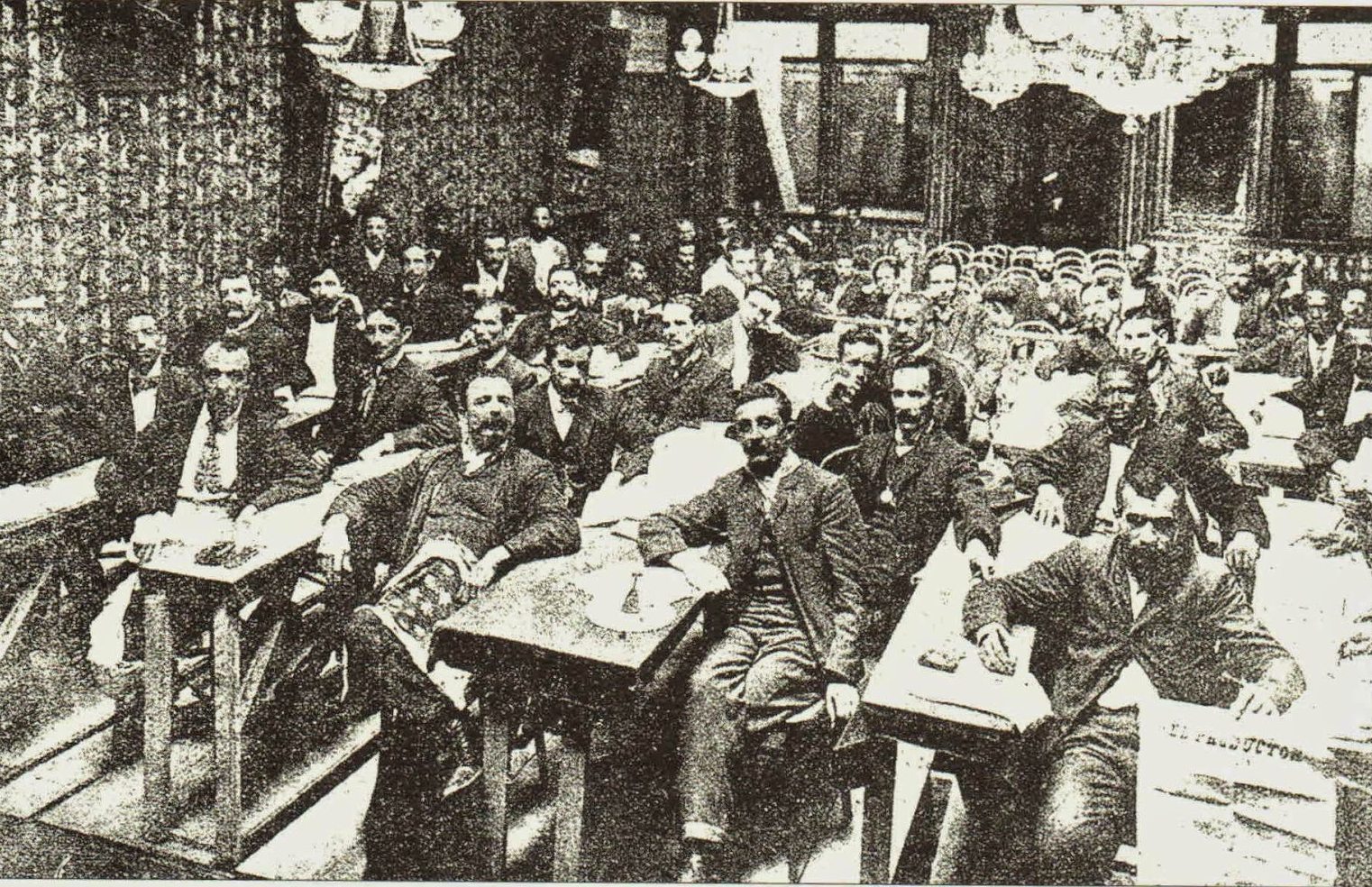
Delegates from the 1st Brazilian Worker Congress, held in April 1906, meeting at the Galician Center, in Rio de Janeiro.

The Congress was held between April 15 and 22, 1906, in the Galego Center, in Rio de Janeiro, with the presence of 43 delegates representing 28 associations linked to industrial branches and sectores such as stevedores, rail and coffee workers, as well as those working in the service sector. Even if not being in the majority, the anarchists - among them Edgard Leuenroth, Joaquim Mota Assunção, Luiz Magrassi and Alfredo Vasques - managed to assert their theses, influencing the congress significantly. In this way, the approved resolutions reflected the influence of revolutionary syndicalism, the trade unionist conception advocated by Brazilian anarchists in that period. Thus, guidelines raised by anarchist militants including union neutrality, federalism, decentralization, direct action and the general strike, began to form part of the principles of the Congress' signatory unions. The choice of the revolutionary syndicalist option was informed by its ability to unify and the comprehensiveness of its program, which provided for the possibility of diverse political and religious opinions, prioritizing the field of economic struggle as the common interest of all workers, and was considered a victory for the anarchists, insofar as the pretensions of influential reformists of the Brazilian labor movement, as was the case of Pinto Machado, leader of the Workers' Union of Ingenuity, Rio de Janeiro. Congress also decided that a confederation and a union newspaper should be set up to provide assistance to federations and give voice to the collective associations. The objectives of this Confederation would be the promotion of the union of workers for the defense of their moral, material, economic and professional interests; straits of solidarity between the organized proletariat, giving greater strength and cohesion to their efforts; to study and propagate the means of emancipation of the proletariat and publicly defend the economic demands of the workers.

=== First phase (1908-1909) ===
The Brazilian Workers' Confederation (Portuguese: Confederação Operária Brasileira, COB) began its activities in Rio de Janeiro in March 1908, two years after the first Brazilian Workers' Congress. According to its constitution, COB started to publish in Rio the journal A Voz do Trabalhador, whose first number appeared at the beginning of the year. During its first years of existence, COB united about 50 unions overall, with the main support bases of the Confederation being organized in the Workers' Federation of Rio de Janeiro (FORJ), in the Workers' Federation of São Paulo (FOSP), in the Workers' Federation of Rio Grande do Sul (FORGS) and in the Bahia Socialist Federation (FSB).

The first phase of the COB lasted until December 1909, when the twenty-first number of A Voz do Trabalhador came out, which then closed the doors. During this period, it presented news from the Confederation and the federated associations, of its meetings, assemblies and strikes; denounced exploitation and working conditions in factories and other workplaces; encouraged the fight for the eight-hour day, also organizing advertising rallies for this purpose. were also held rallies against the Adolfo Gordo Law and the expulsion of immigrants and against a possible war between Brazil and Argentina. COB also organized rallies protesting against the Spanish Government's execution of the anarchist pedagogue Francesc Ferrer. During the years 1910, 1911 and part of 1912, COB and the working federations did not have great performance.

=== Raising and second Brazilian worker Congress (1913) ===
In August 1912, some unions began a new wave of strikes that would last until the 1914 economic recession. In its first months, the workers obtained a series of victories, as was the case with the salary increase granted to the cobblers of Rio de Janeiro. On several occasions the strikers agreed to return to work, under the promise of bosses to partially meet their demands. The most important of these strikes occurred in Minas Gerais, in Juiz de Fora, where, in August, several sectors ceased their activities and the movement assumed the dimensions of a general strike. In addition to the strikes for the reduction of the workday, between 1912 and 1913, several manifestations occurred against the expulsions of foreigners and campaigns against increases in the cost of living.

The new rise of the workers' movement brought reactions by the authorities, with the intensification of repression and an attempt to expand the terms of the Adolfo Gordo Law. On the other hand, the reformists' collaboration with the President Hermes de Fonseca, elected in 1910, made it possible to carry out another Brazilian Workers' Congress in November 1912, at the seat of the Federal Senate and with the support of the Federal Deputy Mário Hermes. Such a Congress, excluding revolutionary tendencies, aimed at creating a workers' party and a new trade union center, the Brazilian Confederation of Labor (Portuguese: Confederação Brasileira do Trabalho, CBT). A group of militants from Rio Grande do Sul was present and retired after presenting a protest motion in which the purposes of the event were denounced, demanding the exclusive legitimacy of the COB. The resolutions of this congress did not go far beyond the publication of a booklet, having little or no practical result in terms of national articulation, building a new central or working party. On the contrary, the disclosure of their preparations motivated anarchists and revolutionary syndicalists to foster a rearticulation with the workers' movement and, therefore, in 1912, discussion began to emerge between the anarchists on the urgency of a new Brazilian worker Congress to assess the effects of the 1906 deliberations and the definition of new directions to combat the reformist advance. FORJ, practically inactive since 1910, was invigorated by a meeting of various trade unionist leaders in May 1912 and, in the beginning of October, brought together labor leaders from Rio de Janeiro for the purpose of reactivating the COB, preparing a reorganizing committee. The Commission declared in January 1913, the reconstitution of the COB, whose direction included Rosendo dos Santos as General Secretary, and João Leuenroth, brother of Edgard, as treasurer. The journal A Voz do Trabalhador was also reactivated. At the end of 1912, COB's reorganizing committee sent to circular working associations in which they asked them for the appointment of delegates to the Second Brazilian Workers' Congress, to be installed in Rio de Janeiro, and in January 1913 the Commission declared the "reconstitution" of COB.

The second Brazilian Worker Congress took place between 8 and 13 September 1913 at the COB headquarters, located on Rua dos Andradas, No. 87, in Rio de Janeiro. Only associations that were composed exclusively of workers, with a minimum of 25 members, were able to adhere to Congress. 59 associations participated in this Congress, in addition to representatives from newspapers considered defenders of the worker cause, such as Myer Feldman of A Voz do Trabalhador (Rio de Janeiro), Edgard Leuenroth of A Lanterna and Astrojildo Pereira of Germinal (São Paulo), and Antonio Certitião of O Trabalho (Bagé).

=== Reorganization attempts ===
In May 1934, during the Government of Getúlio Vargas, anarchist militants of São Paulo tried to reorganize the COB. The Confederation was supported by independent unions from the capital and the interior of São Paulo, the Union of the Workers in Civil Construction from Recife, the Federation of Anti-political Proletarians from Porto Alegre and the Unique Syndicate of Tailors from Uruguaiana. The Pro-COB committee held meetings approving its statutes, however, there was no more news about it after August 1934.

From 1985, with the end of the military dictatorship in Brazil, there were new attempts to reorganize COB, this time, with an anarcho-syndicalist proposal. The initiative was driven by the newspaper O Inimigo do Rei and by militants such as Jaime Cubero. Under the impact of the 1978-1980 strikes at ABC Paulista and the emergence of the so-called "New Unionism", the anarchists articulated around the journal O Inimigo do Rei said:

The worker is verifying the need to act directly, seeking the outputs, as they sought Brazilian workers from the first two decades of the century, through federations that acted without pacts with parties or with government, in a fight that converted nationally for the Workers' Confederation.

The COB's rearticulation attempt also had the engagement of many young people from punk and anarcho-punk movement, which played an active role in the organization of pro-COB nuclei. But the initiative lost strength in the mid-1990s. At least until 2005, some pro-COB cores continued activity in São Paulo and Rio Grande do Sul.

== Organizational structure ==
Following the principles of revolutionary syndicalism, the COB adopted a federative organizational structure. This system guaranteed ample autonomy to individuals in unions, trade unions in their respective federations and, in turn, to the federations belonging to the COB. In this way, the Confederation was made up of national industry or craft federations, local or state unions, unions isolated in places where there were no federations or non-federated industries. Only trade unions formed exclusively by workers, wage earners, and who had the main objective of economic resistance could be part of the Confederation.

The COB's structure adopted collegiate directions and non-hierarchical structures, without the existence of the position of president or paid trade union officials. Each union that adhered had a delegate in the Confederation and contributed to expenses with a monthly quota of 20 reis for each of the members. The Commission responsible for the Confederation was elected for two years and distributed the charges between its members. According to decision of the first Brazilian worker Congress, and following the principles of revolutionary syndicalism, the Confederation was not afforded to any political school or religious doctrine, and could not take part collectively in elections, party or religious manifestations, nor could any use the name of the Confederation or a function of the Confederation in an electoral or religious act.

The COB had its first headquarters initially installed in rua do Hospício (current rua Buenos Aires), nº 144, in the center of Rio de Janeiro. Later, in September 1913, the COB's headquarters would go to the rua dos Andradas, nº 87, the same place as the headquarters of FORJ.

== Bibliography ==
- Azevedo, Raquel (2002). A Resistência Anarquista: Uma questão de identidade (1927-1937) (in Portuguese). São Paulo: Arquivo do Estado/Imprensa Oficial. ISBN 8586726362. OCLC 1000732817.
- Batalha, Claudio H. M. (2000). O movimento operário na Primeira República (in Portuguese). Rio de Janeiro: Jorge Zahar. ISBN 8571105413. OCLC 45084973.
- Dulles, John W. F. (1980). Anarquistas e Comunistas no Brasil, 1900-1935 (in Portuguese). Rio de Janeiro: Nova Fronteira. OCLC 760667226.
- Oliveira, Tiago Bernardon (2018). ""Anarquismo e Revolução": militância anarquista e a estratégia do sindicalismo revolucionário no Brasil da Primeira República". In Santos, Kauan Willian; Silva, Rafael Viana (eds.). História do anarquismo e do sindicalismo de intenção revolucionária no Brasil: novas perspectivas (in Portuguese). Curitiba: Prismas. pp. 207–242. ISSN 2313-9749. OCLC 8605990858.
- Pinheiro, Paulo Sérgio; Hall, Michael M. (1979). A Classe Operária no Brasil: Vol. I — O Movimento Operário (in Portuguese). São Paulo: Alfa Omega. OCLC 1123342268.
- Rocha, Bruno Lima; Santos, Kauan Willian; Penna, Mariana Affonso; Silva, Rafael Viana (2018). ""Ou se vota com os de cima ou se luta com os de baixo": presença e a (re)organização do anarquismo em tempos neoliberais no Brasil (1980-2013)". In Santos, Kauan Willian; Silva, Rafael Viana (eds.). História do anarquismo e do sindicalismo de intenção revolucionária no Brasil: novas perspectivas (in Portuguese). Curitiba: Prismas. pp. 401–429. ISSN 2313-9749. OCLC 8605990858.
- Samis, Alexandre (2004). "Pavilhão negro sobre pátria oliva: sindicalismo e anarquismo no Brasil". In Colombo, Eduardo (org.) (ed.). História do Movimento Operário Revolucionário (in Portuguese). São Paulo: Imaginário. pp. 125–189. ISBN 8576630052. OCLC 82217392.
- Toledo, Edilene (2013). ""Para a união do proletariado brasileiro": A Confederação Operária Brasileira, o sindicalismo e a defesa da autonomia dos trabalhadores no Brasil da Primeira República" (PDF). Perseu (in Portuguese). 7 (10). São Paulo: Editora Fundação Perseu Abramo: 11–31. ISSN 1982-4289. OCLC 228000182.
