= No Trace of Sin =

1983 film

- Directed by: José Fonseca e Costa
- Written by: Mário de Carvalho; José Fonseca e Costa
- Starring: Victoria Abril
- Cinematography: Eduardo Serra
- Music by: Frederico De Brito; Joni Galvao
- Release date: 11 February 1983
- Running time: 104 minutes
- Country: Portugal
- Language: Portuguese

No Trace of Sin (Portuguese: Sem Sombra de Pecado) is a 1983 Portuguese drama film directed by José Fonseca e Costa. The film was selected as the Portuguese entry for the Best Foreign Language Film at the 56th Academy Awards, but was not accepted as a nominee.

== Cast ==
- Victoria Abril as Maria da Luz / Lucilia
- Saul Santos as Cadete
- Armando Cortez as Tenente Sanches (as Armando Cortês)
- João Perry as Uncle Miguel
- Mário Viegas as Aspirante Henrique Sousa Andrade
- Inês de Medeiros as Rita (as Inês D'Almeida)

== See also ==
- List of submissions to the 56th Academy Awards for Best Foreign Language Film
- List of Portuguese submissions for the Academy Award for Best Foreign Language Film
