= A Voz do Trabalhador =

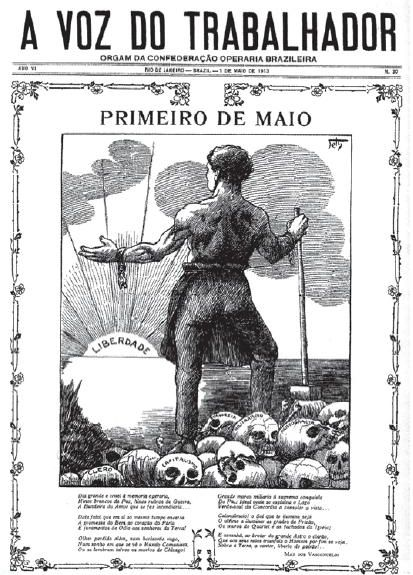
- May 1, 1913 edition of A Voz do Trabalhador
- Type: Monthly (1908-1909); Biweekly (1913-1915)
- Publisher: Brazilian Workers' Confederation
- Editor: Neno Vasco
- Founded: 1908
- Ceased publication: 1915
- Political alignment: Anarcho-syndicalism
- Language: Portuguese
- City: Rio de Janeiro
- Country: Brazil
- OCLC number: 915068550

A Voz do Trabalhador (English: The Worker's Voice) was an anarchist periodical published in Brazil whose main theme was the relationship between anarchism and syndicalism. In addition to this issue, others such as police repression, the high cost of living, solidarity between workers and even libertarian theater and literature were discussed in its pages.

This newspaper was founded in the city of Rio de Janeiro, in 1908, as part of the activities promoted by the Brazilian Workers' Confederation. Neno Vasco was one of the members of its editorial collective. The newsroom of the periodical worked at different addresses, including Rua do Hospício, nº 156; Rua General Câmara, nº 335 and Rua das Andradas, nº 87. The first phase (monthly) ran from 1908 to 1909 and the second, fortnightly, from 1913 to 1915. In the inaugural edition, in an unsigned text, the political wishes of the publication were well outlined: "What we want, and we shall achieve, at all costs, is the emancipation of workers from tyranny and capitalist exploitation, transforming the current regime of wage earners and employers into a regime that allows the development of organizations of producers-consumers, whose initial cell is in the current union of resistance to employers".

The newspaper's contributors usually signed their articles with pseudonyms to avoid persecution by the federal and state government. Among these journalists, in addition to Neno Vasco, were Marcelo Varema, Jagunço, A Barão, Albino Moreira, João Penteado, Amaro de Matos, Manuel Moscoso, Eurípedes Floreal, José Martins and even Lima Barreto, the famous Rio writer and novelist. Lima wrote a chronicle, entitled "Words of an anarchist snob", taking a stand against the official repression promoted by the republican government against immigrants accused of anarchism. The aforementioned writer wrote the following lines, in the edition of A Voz do Trabalhador, dated May 15, 1913: "anarchists speak of humanity for humanity, of humankind for humankind, and not in the name of small competences of political personalities; (...) because they do not use those ignorances or 'snobbery' that give fat sinecures in politics and sentimental successes in bourgeois salons".

Although the militants of anarcho-syndicalism formed a minority, among immigrant workers and Brazilians, the political demands of this group were of paramount importance in the history of some basic labor conquests. The struggle for a daily eight-hour workday, in 1907, for example, started in Rio, ended up acquiring a national dimension. The political and police repression unleashed against supporters of anarchism in Brazil, at the beginning of the 20th century, was quite intransigent and brutal.
