= Armando de Basto =

Portuguese painter

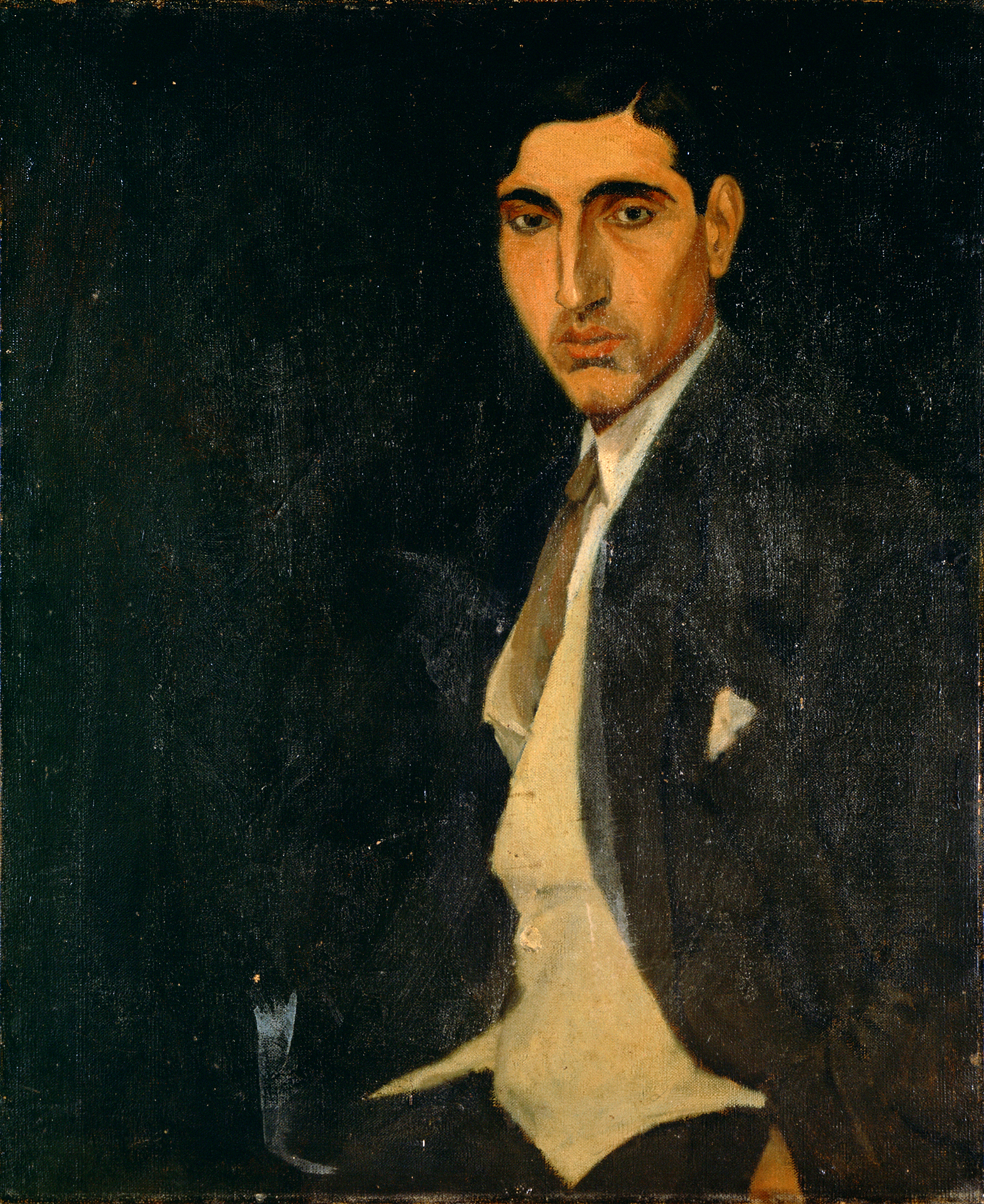
Self-portrait (c.1910–1915)

Armando Pereira de Basto (26 May 1889 in Porto – 1923 in Minho Province) was a Portuguese painter, illustrator, sculptor and decorator.

== Biography ==
He attended the "Escola Superior de Belas-Artes do Porto" from 1903 to 1910, where he studied with José de Brito and João Marques de Oliveira and was awarded the "Prémio Soares dos Reis", given in honor of the sculptor António Soares dos Reis.

In 1910, he went to Paris to complete his studies. While there, he came under the influence of Édouard Manet and Amedeo Modigliani and exhibited at the Salon des Humoristes held in the Palais de Glaces. Together with Aquilino Ribeiro and Tomás Leal da Câmara, he helped create the magazine Génio Latino, which also numbered Manuel Jardim and Anjos Teixeira among its contributors.

He was a great admirer of the caricaturists Rafael Bordalo Pinheiro and Celso Hermínio, so he also participated in their "Exposições de Humoristas e Modernistas", an important venue for promoting Modern art of all varieties, that was created after the establishment of the First Portuguese Republic and ran from 1912 to 1923 in Porto and Lisbon.

In 1914, he was diagnosed with tuberculosis and had to be hospitalized. The following year, he returned home and, in 1916, collaborated on producing the humorous weekly newspaper Miau!, which not only included contributions from his old friends in Paris, now also returned to Portugal, but attracted art work from Théophile Steinlen, Lucien Métivet, Paul Iribe, Francisque Poulbot, Bagaria, Olaf Gulbransson and others outside Portugal as well. He also served as Editor for several long-forgotten humorous journals.

He succumbed to his illness in 1923, after moving to the countryside in search of a better climate.

== Selected works ==
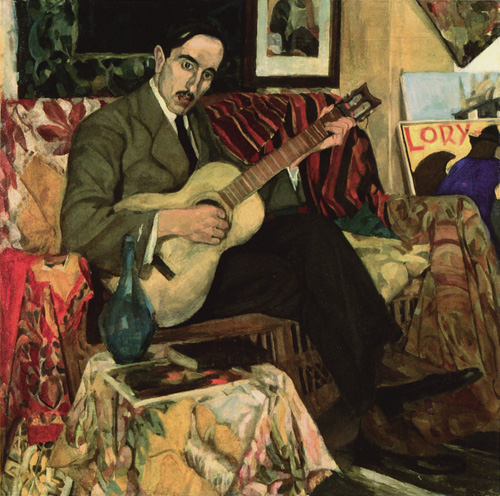
Guitar Player

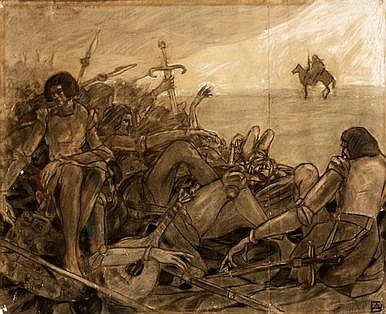
Battle Scene

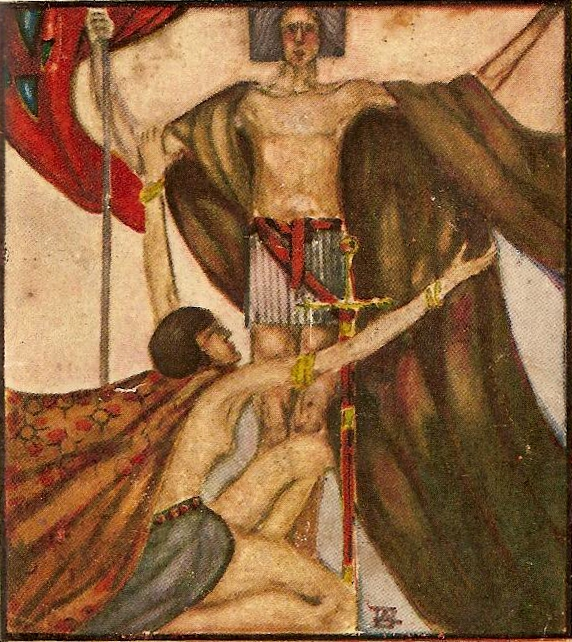
Cover art for Teoria da Indiferença by António Ferro

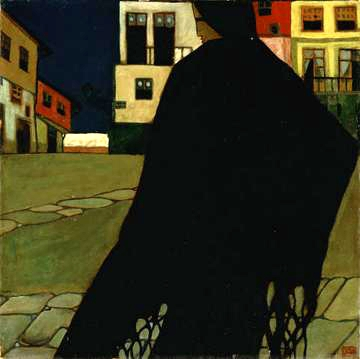
Woman with Shawl
