= Teatro Gil Vicente, Cascais =

Theatre in Cascais, Lisbon District, Portugal

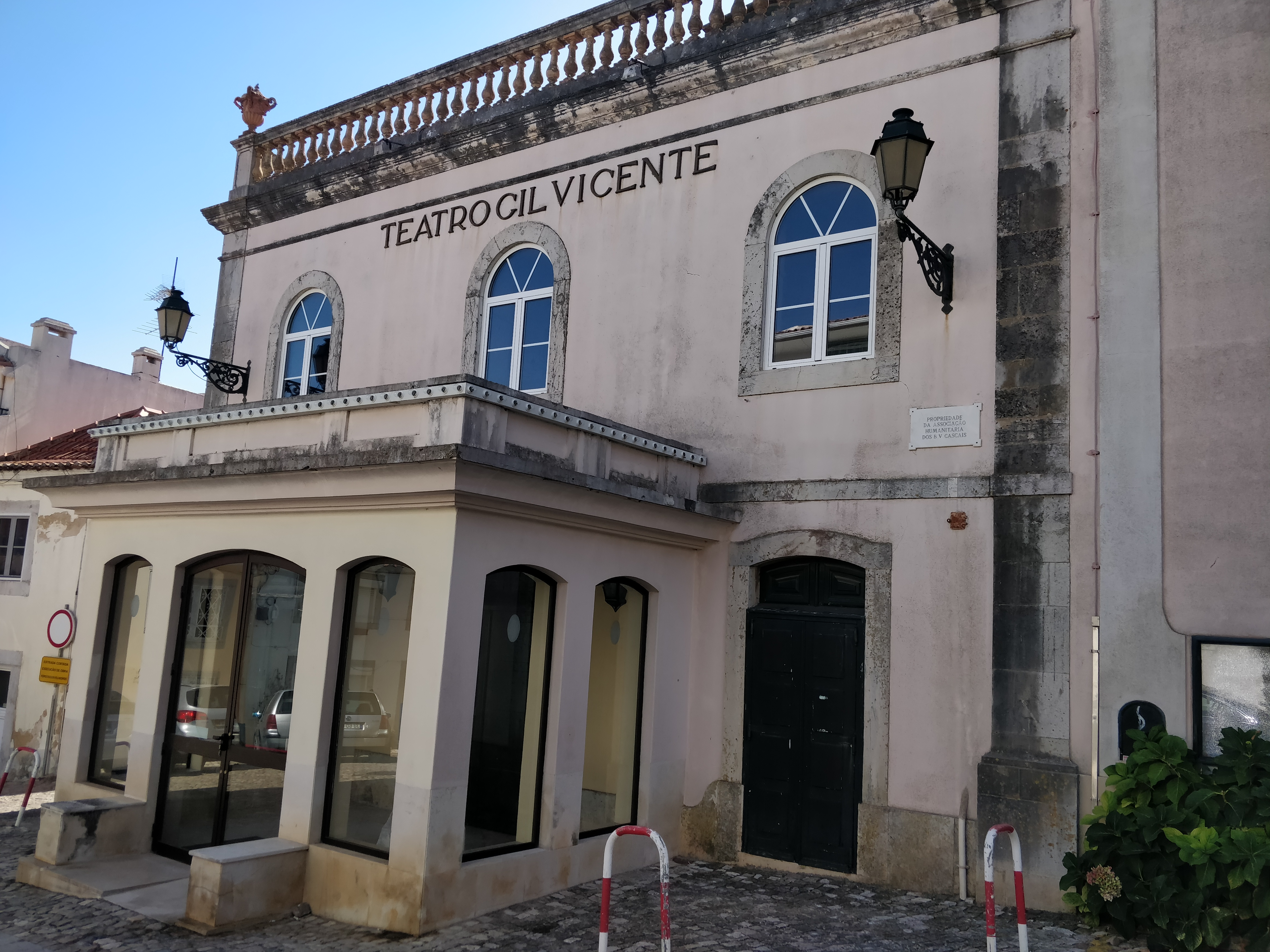
- External view of Teatro Gil Vicente
- Interactive map of Teatro Gil Vicente, Cascais
- Address: R. Gomes Freire 5 Cascais; Portugal
- Coordinates: 38°41′47.1″N 09°25′17.6″W
- Owner: Associação Humanitária dos Bombeiros Voluntários de Cascais
- Capacity: 500

Construction
- Opened: 15 August 1869
- Architect: José Vicente Costa

The Teatro Gil Vicente is a theatre in Cascais, Lisbon District, Portugal. Named after the Portuguese playwright, Gil Vicente, (c. 1465 – c. 1536), the theatre opened in 1869.

== History ==
Teatro Gil Vicente was inaugurated on August 15, 1869, with around 500 seats, consisting of 126 stall seats, 28 boxes and 200 seats in the gallery. The construction was carried out on the initiative of Manuel Rodrigues de Lima, a ship owner. It was built on the site of a small theatre that had been previously adapted from a warehouse. The work was supervised by José Vicente Costa. The scenery for the premiere was painted by two well-known scenographers, Achille Rambois and Giuseppe Cinatti. Although Cascais was just a fishing village in 1869, the decision of the Royal Family to spend part of the summer there from 1870 rapidly increased its importance and in its early years the theatre attracted many famous Portuguese actors. The theatre was often attended by King Luís I and other members of the Royal Family.

Those who have performed at the theatre have included Hans Münch, Sandor Vegh, and Karl Engel in addition to many of the most famous Portuguese artists of the period.

In 1942 the theatre was purchased by the Associação Humanitária dos Bombeiros Voluntários de Cascais (Humanitarian Association of the Voluntary Firefighters of Cascais), which continues to run it as a theatre while also using it as the association’s headquarters. In 1965, Carlos Avilez began the Cascais Experimental Theatre, which was based at the theatre until 1979. The Cascais Experimental Theatre has presented more than a hundred pieces and collaborators have included Eunice Muñoz, Carlos Paredes, José de Almada Negreiros, Júlio Resende, Natália Correia, and Michel Giacometti.

Several other theatres in Portugal have also been named after Gil Vicente, including those in Barcelos and Coimbra.
