= Mário Viegas =

Portuguese actor and poetry reciter (1948–1996)

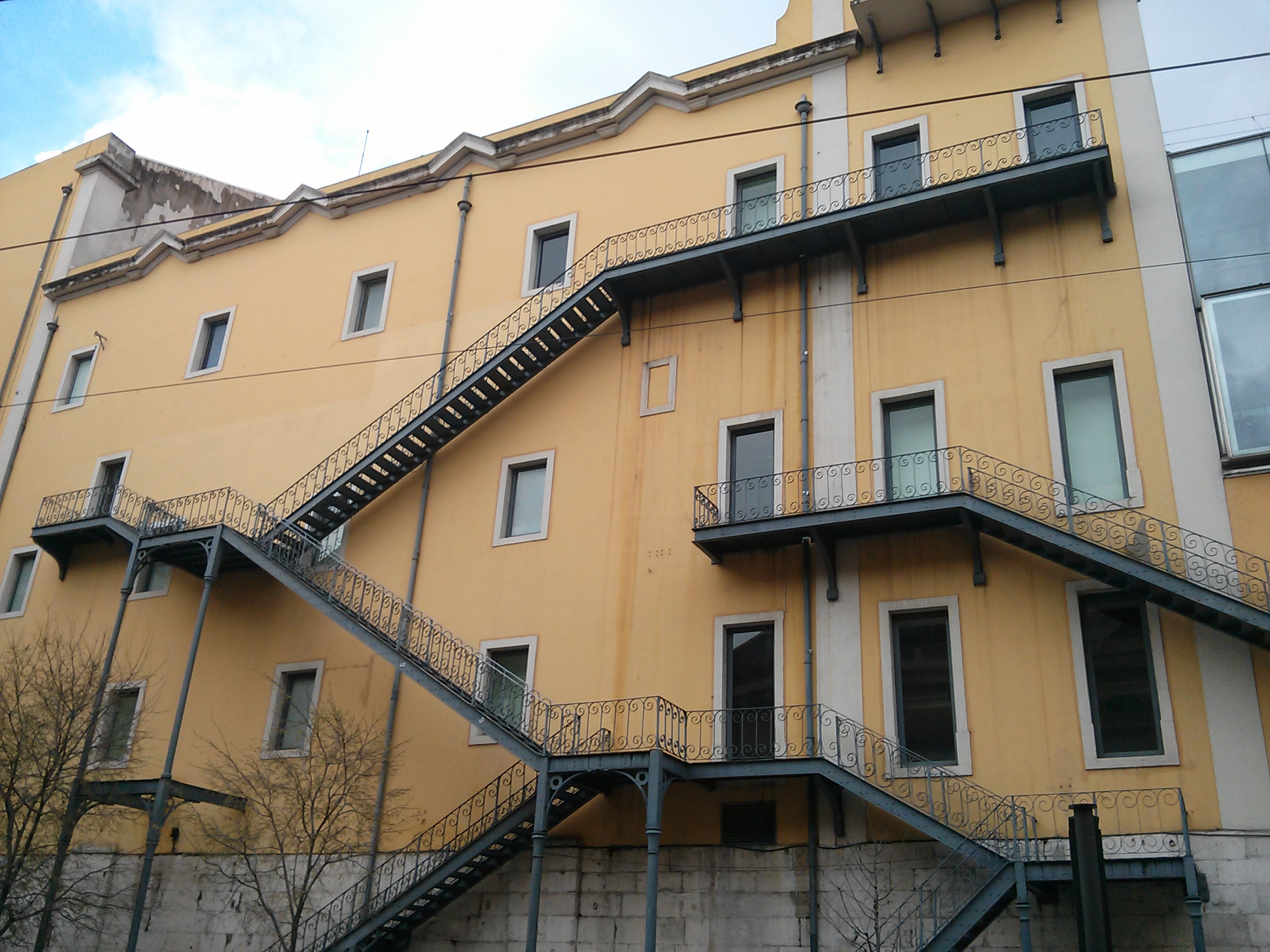
The Mário Viegas Theatre, in Lisbon.

António Mário Lopes Pereira Viegas (born in Santarém on 10 November 1948 – died in Lisbon on 1 April 1996) was a Portuguese actor, theatre director and reciter. He is considered one of the best actors of his generation and one of Portugal's greatest poetry reciters.

== Career and personal life ==
Born on 10 November 1948 and raised in a family from Santarém, which operated pharmacies and had a republican tradition, Mário Viegas became interested in theater while he was still studying history at the Faculdade de Letras da Universidade de Lisboa. Later, after a period living in Porto, he enrolled at the Lisbon Theatre and Film School and made his professional debut at the Teatro Experimental de Cascais with Carlos Avilez.

Mário Viegas' career as an actor focused on theater - throughout his life, he founded three theater companies - the last of which was Companhia Teatral do Chiado. As a director and/or artistic director, he was responsible for adapting and staging the great classics of theater, by authors such as Samuel Beckett, Eduardo De Filippo, Anton Tchekov, August Strindberg, Luigi Pirandello or Peter Shaffer. His last theatrical success was the play Europa Não! Portugal Nunca, in 1995.

At the same time, Mário Viegas also made himself known for his admirable way of saying poetry, recording an extensive discography in which he made known to the general public the work of some of the main Portuguese poets of the 20th century, such as António Gedeão, Fernando Pessoa, Guerra Junqueiro, Cesário Verde, Camilo Pessanha, Jorge de Sena, Ruy Belo or Eugénio de Andrade, but also Luís Vaz de Camões, Bertolt Brecht, Pablo Neruda, among others.

On television, he was responsible for conceiving, directing and presenting the programs Palavras Ditas and Palavras Vivas, where, in addition to classical poets, he promoted authors such as Pedro Oom and Mário-Henrique Leiria to the general public.

Mário Viegas' career in cinema began with the feature film O Funeral do Patrão by Eduardo Geada (1975). He went on to appear in more than 15 films, including regular collaboration with José Fonseca e Costa, such as Kilas, o Mau da Fita (1981), Sem Sombra de Pecado (1983), A Mulher do Próximo (1988) and Os Cornos de Cronos (1991). He also appeared in O Rei das Berlengas by Artur Semedo (1978), Azul, Azul by José de Sá Caetano (1986), Repórter X by José Nascimento (1987), A Divina Comédia by Manoel de Oliveira (1991), Rosa Negra by Margarida Gil (1992), and A Firma Pereira by Roberto Faenza (1996), in which he starred with Marcello Mastroianni.

Viegas' career also includes his forays into politics. In 1995, he ran for parliament as an independent on the Popular Democratic Union's lists. In 1996, also with the support of the PDU, he was a candidate for the Presidency of the Portuguese Republic, adopting the slogan O sonho ao poder (The dream to power), and seeking support in Lisbon's university community. In September of that year, in relation to his candidacy, he revealed his homosexuality to the public, however he later retreated his candidacy due to his worsening health condition.

He was also a columnist for the Diário Económico, where he wrote about theater and humor. He published an autobiography entitled Auto-Photo Biography, in 1995.

Viegas died of AIDS on 1 April 1996, at the Santa Maria Hospital. His body is in a shallow grave in the artists' section of the Prazeres Cemetery in Lisbon.

== Works ==
=== Audio recordings ===
- 1972 - Palavras Ditas, LP Orfeu
- 1975 - O Operário em Construção e 3 Poemas de Brecht, EP Orfeu
- 1974 - País de Abril, poems of Manuel Alegre, LP, Estúdios Polysom, Lisboa, Edição Orfeu
- 1976 – 3 Poemas de Amor, Ódio e Alguma Amargura, Edição Arnaldo Trindade Lda., Orfeu
- 1978 – Pretextos para Dizer…, LP Orfeu
- 1980 – Humores, 2 LP Orfeu STAT 100
- 1973 – O Guardador de Rebanhos, Alberto Caeiro – Fernando Pessoa, 2 Vinyl Sassetti
- 1990 - Poemas de Bibe: Grande Poesia Portuguesa Escolhida para os Mais Pequenos, with Manuela de Freitas, UPAV
- 1993 - No Centenário de Almada Negreiros: Manifesto Anti-Dantas, CD Orfeu

=== Filmography ===
Some of his movies include:

- 1975, O Funeral do Patrão
- 1977, A Santa Aliança
- 1978, O Rei das Berlengas (D. Lucas Telmo de Midões)
- 1980, Kilas, o Mau da Fita (Rui Tadeu - pseudonym Kilas)
- 1980, A Culpa (Adriano)
- 1983, Sem Sombra de Pecado (Aspirante Henrique Sousa Andrade)
- 1985, A Boa Pessoa de Setzuan (Telefilme)
- 1986, 2002 Odisseia no Terreiro do Paço (Telefilme)
- 1986, Filmezinhos de Sam (Telefilme)
- 1986, Azul, Azul (Mário)
- 1987, Repórter X (Sete Línguas)
- 1987, Balada da Praia dos Cães (Voz do Capitão Dantas)
- 1988, A Mulher do Próximo (Henrique)
- 1990, Segno di Fuoco (usurário)
- 1991, O Suicidário (Telefilme)
- 1991, Os Cornos de Cronos (Professor Álvaro)
- 1991, A Divina Comédia (Filósofo)
- 1992, Rosa Negra (Barriga d'Água)
- 1994, Fado Lusitano (Narrador)
- 1995, Afirma Pereira (Editor)
- 1996, O Judeu (D. João VI) (Telefilme)

=== Television ===
- 1979, D. João VI (TV series)
- 1984, Palavras Ditas
- 1989, Um Filmezinho de Sam
- 1989, Rua Sésamo (TV series)
- 1991, Palavras Vivas
- 1991, Napoléon et l'Europe (TV series)
- 1992, Contradições (TV series)

=== Theatre ===
- 1973, Oh papá, pobre papá, a mamã pendurou-te no armário e eu estou tão triste, of Arthur Kopit, Casa da Comédia

== Bibliography ==
- Mário Viegas (coord.), (1990–1995), Companhia Teatral do Chiado, 13 Programas de Sala
- Mário Viegas, (coord.) Rita Azevedo Gomes, Francisco Grave, Lisboa, Cinemateca Portuguesa, 1997, ISBN 972-619-115-7
- Mário Viegas: Actor (1948-1996), [org.] Comissão Municipal de Toponímia; textos Paula Machado; coord. António Trindade, Álvaro Albuquerque, Lisboa, 1999
- Um rapaz chamado Mário Viegas, Museu Nacional do Teatro; coord. José Carlos Alvarez; textos e depoimentos Raquel Henriques da Silva, fotografia J. Marques, Lisboa, 2001. ISBN 972-776-096-1
- Mário Viegas: O sonho ao poder (1948-1996), de Filipe Esménio, Editora Licorne, 2008. ISBN 978-972-8645-58-8
- Mário Viegas: discografia completa, coordenação José Niza; revisão Luís Miguel Queirós, Lisboa, Público, 2006. ISBN 989-619-028-3. ISBN 989-619-029-1. ISBN 989-619-030-5. ISBN 989-619-032-1. ISBN 989-619-033-X. ISBN 989-619-034-8. ISBN 989-619-035-6. ISBN 989-619-027-5. ISBN 989-619-036-4. ISBN 989-619-038-0. ISBN 989-619-039-9. ISBN 989-619-053-4. ISBN 989-619-054-2
