= Neno Vasco =

Portuguese anarchist (1878–1920)

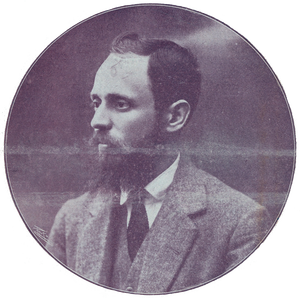
- Born: Gregório Nazianzeno Moreira de Queiroz e Vasconcelos; May 9, 1878; Penafiel, District of Porto, Kingdom of Portugal
- Died: September 15, 1920 (aged 42); São Romão do Coronado, Trofa, First Portuguese Republic
- Occupations: Writer, journalist, translator
- Movement: Anarcho-syndicalism
- Spouse: Mercedes Moscoso

Neno Vasco (May 9, 1878 – September 15, 1920) was a poet, lawyer, journalist, anarchist, writer, and ardent revolutionary syndicalist activist born in Penafiel, Portugal. He emigrated to Brazil where he established a series of projects with the anarchists of that country. He was the author of the Portuguese translation of The Internationale, which is more widespread in Portuguese-speaking countries, and was said to have been one of the most important figures of Anarchism in Portugal.

== Biography ==
Gregório Nazianzeno Moreira de Queiroz e Vasconcelos, better known as Neno Vasco, was born in Penafiel on May 9, 1878. At the age of 8 or 9 he emigrated with his father and stepmother to the city of São Paulo, Brazil. A few years later, he returned to Portugal to complete his studies and live in his paternal grandparents' house in Amarante.

He enrolled at the Faculty of Law of the University of Coimbra on October 13, 1896, where he began to take classes. He had illustrious future colleagues and friends of Portuguese intellectuals such as the poet Teixeira de Pascoaes, Faria de Vasconcelos and António Resende. In 1900, during his visits to Porto, he met a group of libertarian propagandists in which Cristiano de Carvalho and Serafim Cardoso Lucena participated. In 1901 he completed his bachelor's degree.

At the end of 1901 he returned to Brazil where he quickly established contact with Italian anarchists through which he learned of the work of Errico Malatesta, who from that moment on exerted a profound influence on his thought.

In the city of São Paulo, in 1902, he began to edit the Amigo do Povo newspaper together with Benjamim Mota, Oreste Ristori, Giulio Sorelli, Tobia Boni, Ângelo Bandoni, Gigi Damiani and Ricardo Gonçalves. The journal's influence was immediate as one of the main spaces for dialogue on the Brazilian anarchist movement.

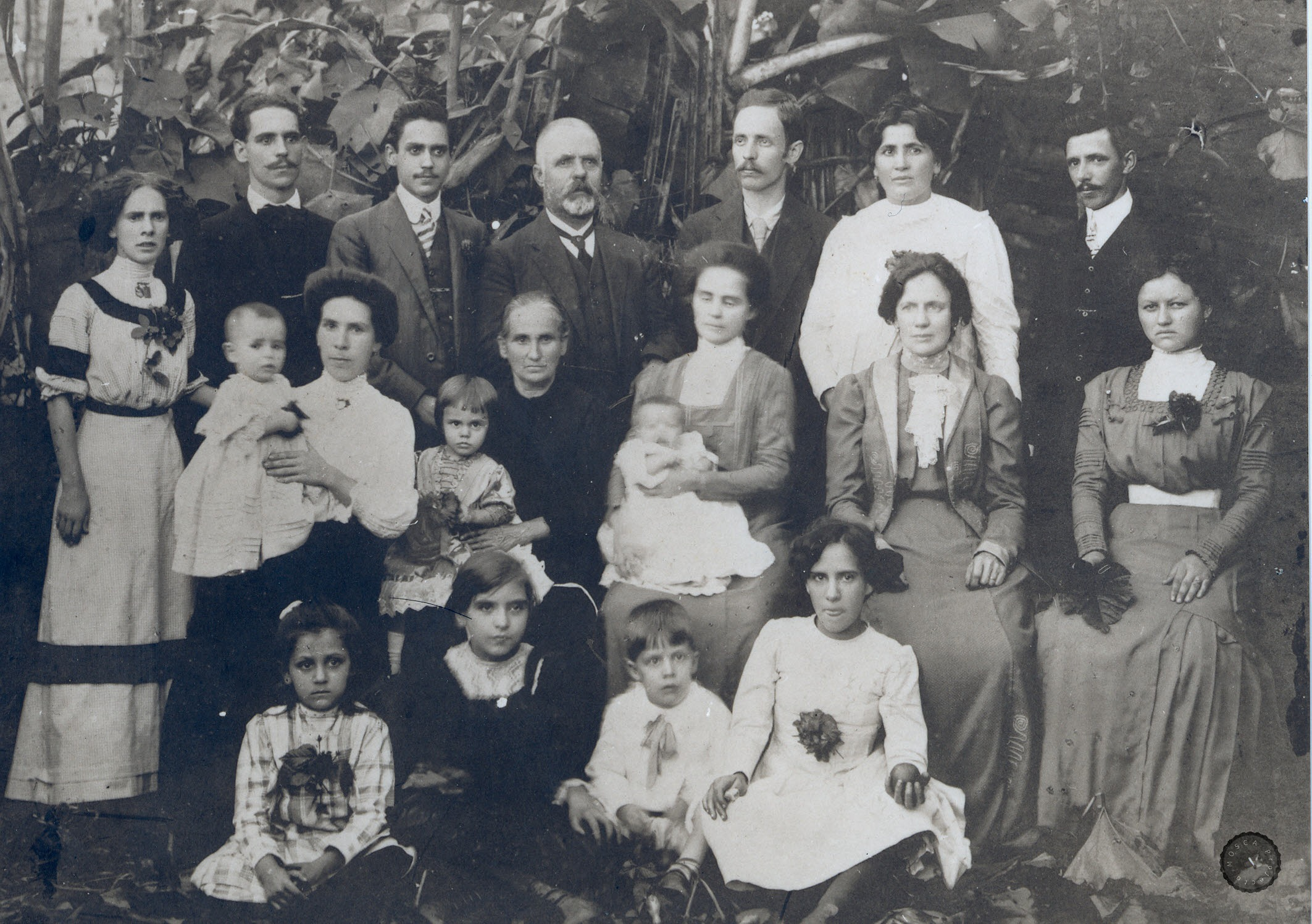
Photograph of Vasco's family

In 1904 he translated into Portuguese from French the work Evolution, Revolution and the Anarchist Ideal by Élisée Reclus. In 1905 he married Mercedes Moscoso.

When the First Portuguese Republic was proclaimed in 1910, Neno Vasco returned to Portugal where he continued to develop his anarchist militancy, collaborating with the Brazilian anarchist press as a correspondent. He became a constant contributor to the libertarian magazine A Sementeira in which he wrote about the social situation in Brazil. As well as in the newspaper A Aurora (1910–1919) and the magazine Renovação (1925–1926).

On September 15, 1920, Neno Vasco died of tuberculosis, a few months after his wife.

== "The Anarchist Conception of Syndicalism" ==
Throughout the 1910s, as an anarchist propagandist, Neno developed the anarchist conception of the trade union by addressing the ideas of Malatesta, among other authors, about revolutionary syndicalism. At the end of his life, he began to work on a work, which would remain unfinished, on the role that anarchists should play in mass organizations, more specifically in unions, as well as addressing doctrine and disputes with Marxists in the International Workingmen's Association (IWA). In this work Neno defended that "the workers union is the essential group, the specific organ of class struggle and the reorganizing nucleus of the future society" which must participate in the "solidarity struggle of the workers against the bosses" through direct action. The role of anarchists in these unions must be propaganda, spreading anarchist ideas and warding off the reformist, parliamentary tendency of political parties that only defended full participation in the bourgeois social system, a harmony between capital and labor. Therefore, the workers' organization must "live independently of any political party or doctrinal grouping" to emphasize the revolutionary character, "resistance must be the only union function".

=== Cooperatives and Mutualism ===
In some paragraphs of this book, the author addresses mutualism and cooperatives, stating that "they serve and facilitate capitalist exploitation, becoming factors of resignation and passivity". For Neno, these organizations can be even more harmful than corporatism, because "it naturally tends towards the adaptation of the wage earner to the bourgeois regime, even favoring submission to the conditions imposed by the employers". In addition to promoting the creation of a "parasitic permanent bureaucracy", which, sooner or later, will "develop the commercial spirit and corrupt the best intentions".

=== Social Democracy and Parliamentarianism ===
Criticism of workers' reforms are constant throughout the book, stating that "the "workers' law" only serves to deceive the unconscious masses by giving a false prestige to governments and parliamentary institutions and tending to divert the people from direct organization and action." For Neno, the law is only applied when the proletariat wants this reform to be approved, when workers have the strength to impose their will on the rulers.

As for the parliament, to Neno this was nothing more than a tool of the bourgeoisie to appease the workers' struggles, and corrupt the combative spirit of the social movements:

"Parliament is the work and instrument of political and financial oligarchies – and everything it touches is corrupted and impotent. And what seems to remain intact and incorrupt in it only maintains the disastrous prestige of a fiction. Revolution, robust child of the circumstances and will of men, the revolution that marks the painful birth, but necessary and welcome, of all societies." p.151

== Works ==
=== Bibliography ===
- A Academia de Coimbra ao Povo Portuguez, 1901.
- Geórgias: ao trabalhador rural, Terra Livre, Lisboa, 1913.
- Da Porta da Europa (factos e ideias: a questão religiosa, a questão política, a questão económica 1911–1912), Bibl. Libertas, Lisboa, 1913.
- Sindicalismo Revolucionário, 1914.
- A Concepção Anarquista do Sindicalismo, Editorial A Batalha, Lisboa, 1920; 2ª edição, Afrontamento, Porto, 1984. In 2007, a Brazilian version used in union training courses was published.

=== Translations ===
- Élisée Reclus, Evolution, Revolution and the Anarchist Ideal, Biblioteca Sociológica, S. Paulo, 1904.
- The Internationale, 1909.

=== Theater plays ===
- Anedota em 1 acto, 1911
- Greve de Inquilinos: farça em 1 acto, Editorial A Batalha, 1923.
- Pecado de Simonia, 1907.

== Bibliography ==
- Dulles, John W. F. (1980). Anarquistas e Comunistas no Brasil, 1900–1935 (in Portuguese). Rio de Janeiro: Nova Fronteira. OCLC 760667226.
- Oliveira, Tiago Bernardon (2018b). ""Anarquismo e Revolução": militância anarquista e a estratégia do sindicalismo revolucionário no Brasil da Primeira República". In Santos, Kauan Willian; Silva, Rafael Viana (eds.). História do anarquismo e do sindicalismo de intenção revolucionária no Brasil: novas perspectivas (in Portuguese). Curitiba: Prismas. pp. 207–242. ISBN 9788555079528.
- Samis, Alexandre (2004). "Pavilhão negro sobre pátria oliva: sindicalismo e anarquismo no Brasil". In Colombo, Eduardo (ed.). História do Movimento Operário Revolucionário (in Portuguese). São Paulo: Imaginário. pp. 125–189. ISBN 8576630052. OCLC 82217392.
- Samis, Alexandre (2017). "Contra limites e fronteiras: Neno Vasco e o anarquismo em dois continentes" (PDF). Navegar (in Portuguese). 3 (4): 10–38. Archived from the original (PDF) on September 16, 2018.
- Samis, Alexandre (2018). Minha pátria é o mundo inteiro: Neno Vasco, o anarquismo e o sindicalismo revolucionário (in Portuguese). São Paulo: Imaginário. ISBN 9789899511484. OCLC 382406472.
- Silva, Thiago Lemos (2023). Neno Vasco por Neno Vasco: fragmentos autobiográficos de um anarquista. Teresina: Cancioneiro. ISBN 978-65-5380-081-6.
