= Rita Ferro (writer) =

Portuguese novelist, writer and journalist

- Born: Rita Maria Roquette de Quadros Ferro; 26 February 1955 (age 71); Lisbon, Portugal
- Other names: Rita Maria Roquette de Quadros Ferro Ochôa
- Occupations: Novelist and journalist

Rita Ferro (born 1955) is a Portuguese writer, journalist, playwright and teacher.

== Early life ==
Rita Maria Roquette de Quadros Ferro Ochôa was born on 26 February 1955 in the Portuguese capital of Lisbon. She is the daughter of writer and philosopher António Quadros and Paulina Roquette Ferro. Her paternal grandmother was the writer Fernanda de Castro, and her paternal grandfather was António Ferro, a writer, journalist, and politician who was associated with the repressive Estado Novo regime in the mid-20th Century. Ferro studied design, specializing in marketing. Following internships in Brazil, Spain, the USA and the United Kingdom, she taught advertising at the Instituto de Arte, Design e Empresa (Institute of Art, Design and Enterprise - IADE), which her father founded in 1969. She also worked as an advertising writer for Reader’s Digest in Portugal and other publishers.

== Writing ==
Ferro began her literary career in 1990, with the publication of the novel O Nó na Garganta, which sold more than 50,000 copies. Since then, she has written more than 20 novels, as well as biographies, youth literature and plays. She has been a judge for literary awards and at film festivals and has published articles in magazines and newspapers, such as Revista LER, the Portuguese edition of Marie Claire, Diário de Notícias and A Capital. She also worked on a television programme for the Portuguese national broadcaster, RTP, and has been on several radio programmes. In 2011, she published her first autobiographical novel, A menina é filha de quem? (Whose daughter is she?), which received the Portuguese PEN Club award for prose fiction in 2012. Ferro also teaches courses in creative writing and has written a television script and two theatrical plays.

== Publications ==
A list of Ferro's main publications follows:

=== Novels ===
- O nó na garganta (Dom Quixote, 1990)
- O vestido de lantejoulas (Dom Quixote, 1991)
- O vento e a lua (Dom Quixote, 1992)
- Por instinto (Editorial Notícias, 2000)
- Os filhos da mãe (Dom Quixote, 2000)
- A menina dança? (Dom Quixote, 2002)
- Uma mulher não chora (Dom Quixote, 2002)
- És Meu! (Dom Quixote, 2003)
- Não me contes o fim (Dom Quixote, 2005)
- As caras da Mãe (Dom Quixote, 2006)
- Responde se és Homem (Dom Quixote, 2007)
- 13 gotas ao deitar (Oficina do Livro, 2009)
- 4 & 1 Quarto (Dom Quixote, 2009)
- Chocolate (2010)
- A menina é filha de quem? (Dom Quixote, 2011)
- Veneza pode esperar – Diário 1 (Dom Quixote, 2013) (ISBN 978-972-2054-06-5)
- A secretária de Sidónio Paes (Glaciar), 2014) (ISBN 978-989-8776-12-9)
- Só se morre uma vez – Diário 2 (Dom Quixote, 2015)
- Um amante no Porto (Dom Quixote, 2018)
- Os pássaros cantam em grego – Diário 3 (Dom Quixote, 2020)

=== Chronicles ===
- Por tudo e por nada (Dom Quixote, 2002)
- Os cromos de Rita Ferro (Dom Quixote, 2003)
- Sexo na desportiva (Dom Quixote, 2007)

=== Other publications ===
- Retrato de uma família, with Mafalda Ferro (1999)
- Desculpe lá, mãe!, with Marta Gautier (1998)
- Fotobiografia de Sebastião Alves, with Ana Vidal (2004)
- Querida menopausa, with Helena Sacadura Cabral (2005)
- As caras da Mãe (2005)
- 13 gotas ao deitar, in collaboration with Alice Vieira, Catarina Fonseca, Leonor Xavier, Luísa Beltrão and Rosa Lobato de Faria (2009)
- O falcão e a formiga
