= António Ferro =

Portuguese journalist and author

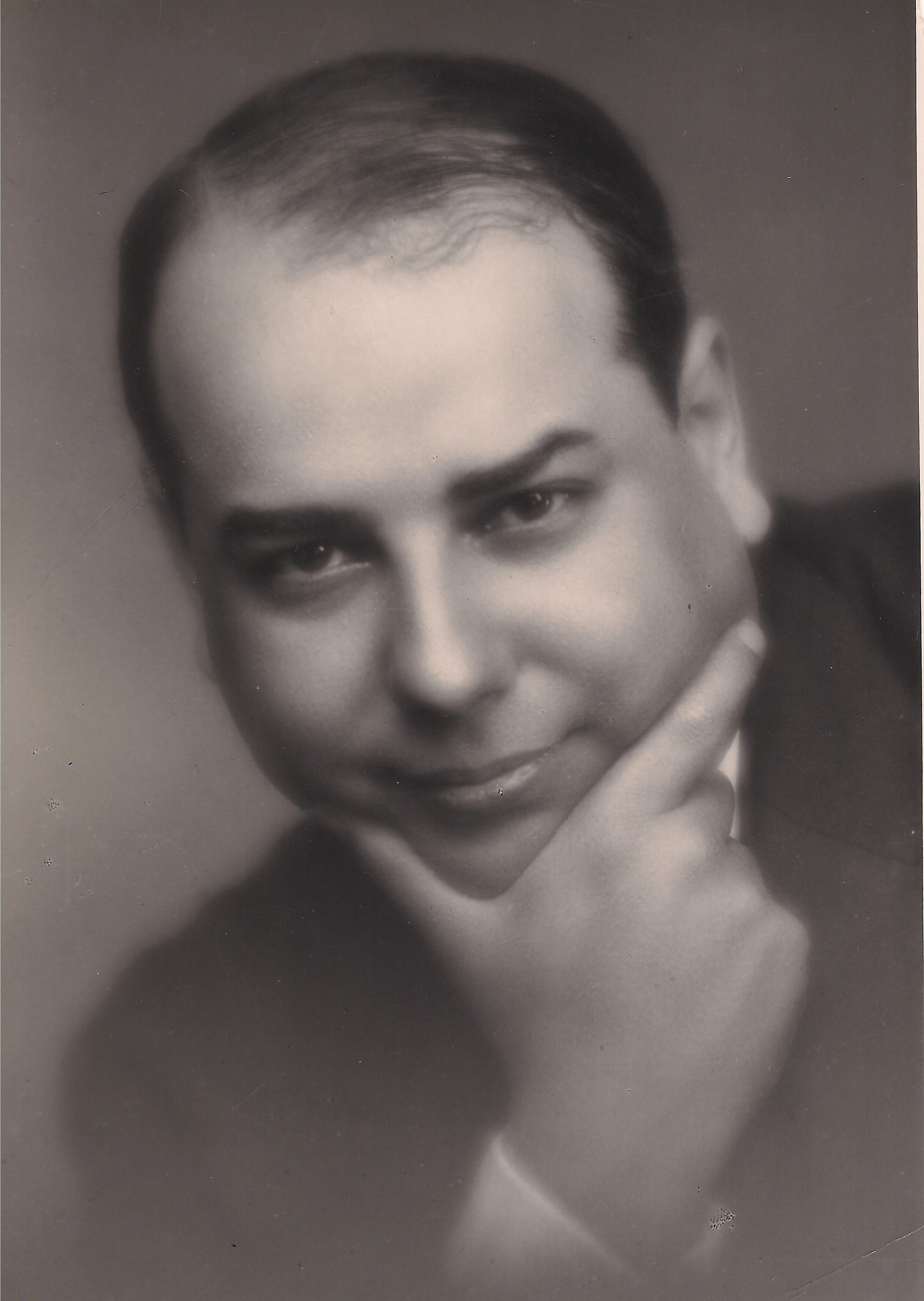
Antonio Ferro (early 1930s?)

António Joaquim Tavares Ferro (17 August 1895, Lisbon - 11 November 1956, Lisbon) was a Portuguese writer, journalist and politician, associated with the Estado Novo.

== Biography ==
In 1915, when he was barely 19, his friend, Mário de Sá Carneiro, appointed him as editor of the magazine Orpheu, precisely because he was still a minor, with 21 being the age of majority at the time as per the Portuguese Civil Code. This position did not last long, however, as Sá Carneiro's father withdrew his financial support after only two issues. During the 1920s, he became a reporter for O Século and the Diário de Lisboa, was briefly Director of the Illustração Portugueza and served as an international correspondent for Diário de Notícias.

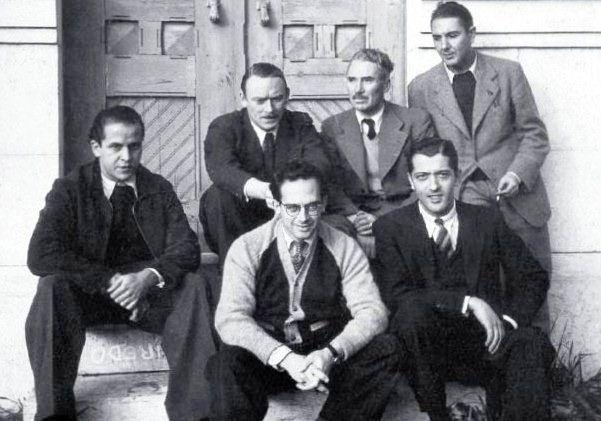
Artists who worked for the SPN. (1939). Top row, from the left: Thomaz de Mello, Fred Kradolfer, Emmerico Nunes and Bernardo Marques. Bottom, Carlos Botelho and José Rocha

He also contributed prose and poetry to several literary journals. In 1920, he published one of his best known works, a collection of aphorisms and "paradoxes" called the Teoria da Indiferença (Theory of Indifference). He also produced a self-described "fragmentary novel", Leviana (Frivolous) and, in 1921, created Nós (We), a Modernist manifesto. Ferro became famous in 1926 as the journalist who solved the murder of the actress Maria Alves.

Having begun as a member of the Portuguese Republican Party, he evolved into a Sidonista and supporter of authoritarian regimes, reflected in his book of interviews, Viagem à Volta das Ditaduras (Journey Around the Dictatorships, 1927). He especially admired Benito Mussolini, who he interviewed three times in Rome. Adolf Hitler and Primo de Rivera also granted him brief interviews.

Early in 1932, he suggested to Salazar that an organization should be established to advertise the achievements of his regime and promote its programs. Later that year, he began publishing a series of interviews with Salazar in the Diário de Notícias, which were gathered into a book in 1933: Salazar, o Homem e a Obra (The Man and His Work). His political career took off in earnest when he was appointed Director of the "Secretariado da Propaganda Nacional" (SPN) later that year. After World War II, the organization's name was changed to the "Secretariado Nacional de Informação" (SNI). He remained its Director until 1949, when he joined the Portuguese legation in Bern.

During those years he was involved in a wide variety of cultural activities in addition to the more blatant propaganda screeds. He served as Commissioner-General for international exhibitions in Paris (1937) and New York (1939), played a major role in organizing the "Exposição do Mundo Português" of 1940, and directed production of the associated Revista dos Centenários, a propaganda journal that ran for 24 issues and included contributions from such notables as Vitorino Nemésio, Júlio Dantas and Aquilino Ribeiro. He was also involved in creating the Museu de Arte Popular and the "Companhia Portuguesa de Bailado Verde-Gaio", a dance company that performed from 1940 to 1977. The Pousadas de Portugal were created through his initiatives.

In 1954, he transferred to the legation in Rome. Two years later, he died of an infection following minor surgery. He was married to the poet, Fernanda de Castro, his son was the writer and philosopher known as António Quadros, and the writer Rita Ferro is his granddaughter.

== Selected works ==
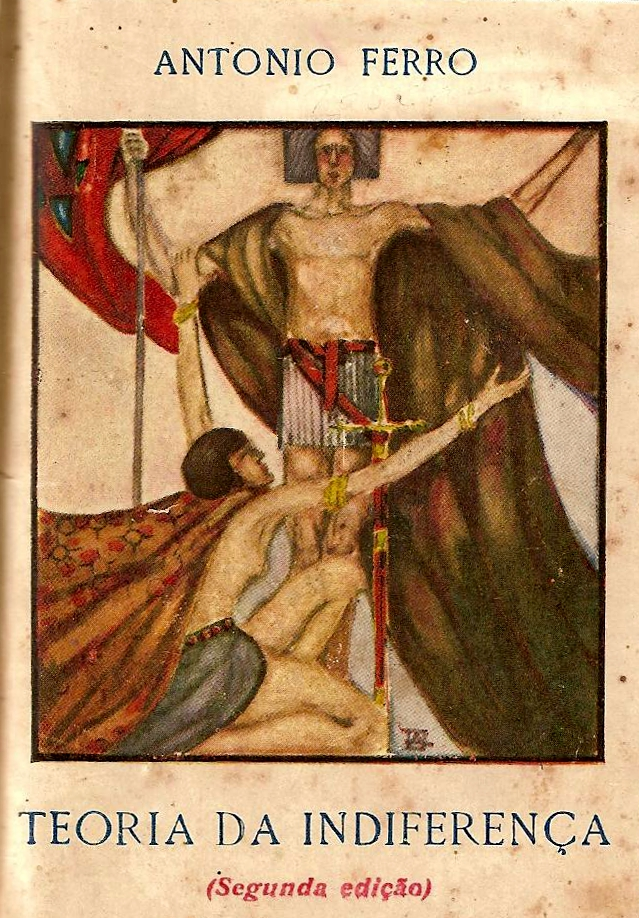
Teoria da Indiferença, 1920. Cover design by Armando de Basto.

=== In English ===
- Salazar: Portugal and Her Leader, translated by H. de Barros Gomes and John Gibbons with a preface by Sir Austen Chamberlain. Faber & Faber limited, 1939

=== In Portuguese ===
- Teoria da Indiferença (1920), 3rd Edition, Roger Delraux, 1979.
- Leviana (1921), Novela em fragmentos com um estudo crítico do author, 4th Edition, Roger Delraux, 1979.
- Gabriele d'Annunzio e Eu (1922)
- A Idade do Jazz-Band (1923), 2nd Edition, Portugalia, 1924.
- Batalha de Flores (1923), reprint, Europress, 1988. ISBN 972-55-9109-7
- A Amadora dos Fenómenos (1925), Ediçiones Civilização
- Viagem à Volta das Ditaduras (1927), Ediçao da Emprêsa Diario de noticias
- Salazar, o Homem e a Obra (1933), reprint, F. Pereira, 1982
- Homens e Multidões (1941), 2nd Edition, J. Olympio, 1950
- D. Manuel II, o Desventurado (1954), Livreria Bertrand.
