= Faria de Vasconcelos =

Portuguese educator

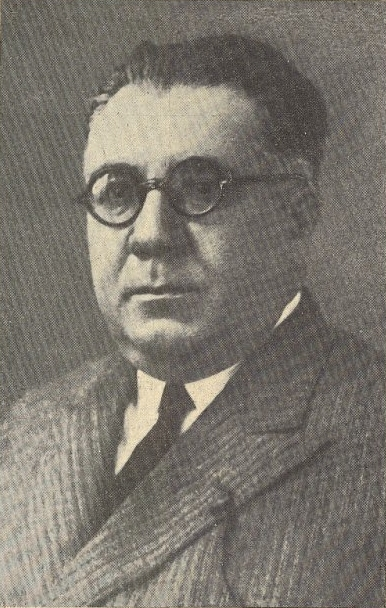
Faria de Vasconcelos

António de Sena Faria de Vasconcelos Azevedo (1880–1939) was a Portuguese educator and educationalist.

Faria de Vasconcelos studied law in Coimbra before going to study at the New University of Brussels in 1902 . Like many Portuguese teachers in the first half of the twentieth century, he spent some time at the Rousseau Institute in Geneva, where he was a student of Édouard Claparède.

He was headmaster of an experimental school at Bierges-les-Wavre, though the school did not survive World War I, and a professor at the New University of Brussels. He subsequently directed a training school for secondary school teachers which had been founded by Georges Rouma in 1909. From 1918 to 1920 he taught a specialized course in educational psychology for school doctors at the normal school at Sucre in Bolivia. He was later a professor at Lisbon, where he founded the Institute of Careers Guidance (Instituto de Orientação Profissional) in 1925.

== Works ==
- Lições de Pedologia e Pedagogia Experimental. Lisboa: Antiga Casa Bertrand, 1908.
- Une école nouvelle en Belgique. Préface de M. Adolphe Ferrière. Neuchâtel: Delachaux & Niestlé, 1915. − A New School in Belgium. With an Introduction by Adolphe Ferrière. Translated from the French by Eden and Cedar Paul. London: George G. Harrap & Co., 1919. − Una escuela nueva en Bélgica. Prefacio de Adolphe Ferrière. Traducción de Domingo Barnés. Madrid: Francisco Beltrán, 1920. − Uma escola nova na Bélgica; pref. de Adolphe Ferrière; posf. e notas de Carlos Meireles-Coelho; trad. Carlos Meireles-Coelho, Ana Cotovio, Lúcia Ferreira. 1ª ed. Aveiro: Universidade de Aveiro, 2015.
- The Place of the Idea of Death and its Moral Effects in Education, Sucre, Bolivia: Porcel, 1918. Translated by Phyllis Blanchard.
