= São Paulo Revolt of 1924 =

Rebellion in Brazil

- Part of Tenentism
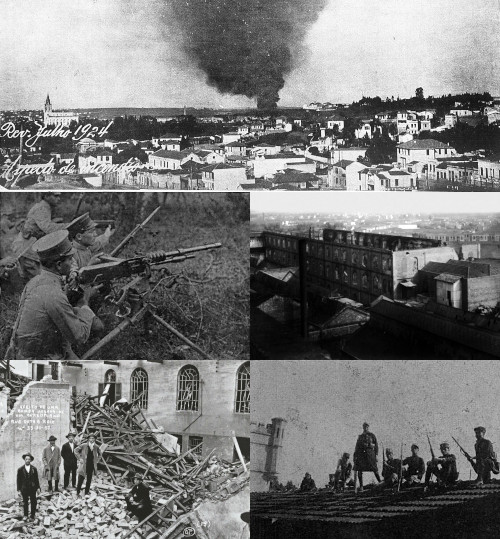
- At the top: fires in São Paulo. Middle left: machine gun position in Vila Mariana. Middle right: Cotonifício Crespi damaged by the bombings. Bottom left: effects of an air attack. Bottom right: soldiers on the roof of the 1st Battalion of the Public Force.
| Date | 5–28 July 1924 (capital); July–September 1924 (countryside) |
| Location | São Paulo and southern Mato Grosso (now Mato Grosso do Sul), Brazil |
| Result | Loyalist army military victory; Start of the Paraná Campaign; Outbreak of parallel uprisings |

Belligerents
| Tenentist rebels: Brazilian Army (partly); Public Force of São Paulo (partly); Civilian volunteers; Foreign Battalions | Brazil: Brazilian Army; Brazilian Navy; Public Forces: São Paulo; Minas Gerais; Rio de Janeiro; Espírito Santo; Rio Grande do Sul; Paraná; Santa Catarina; Patriotic battalions |

Commanders and leaders
| Isidoro Dias Lopes; Miguel Costa | Artur Bernardes; Carlos de Campos; Abílio de Noronha; Eduardo Sócrates |

Units involved
| Revolutionary Division (See order of battle) | 2nd Military Region; Division of Operations in the State of São Paulo (See order of battle) |

Strength
| On 5 July: 1,000 men; Mid-month: 3–3,500 men (Note: This value is closest to the effective number of combatants (Santos 2013, p. 32). Some sources cite up to 7,000 (Lopes 2019).); 26 guns (Note: Santos 2013, p. 74-75 admits the confusion of numbers between the sources and prefers to register 26, based on the police investigation and on the Book of the Centenary of the Public Force.) | On 5 July: 1,000 men; Mid-month: 14–15,000 men (Note: Estimated value by Abílio de Noronha (Santos 2013, p. 37). Lopes 2019 cites 18,000.); 3,500 in the interior (Note: 2,000 on the southwest axis and 1,500 on the north axis (Santos 2013, p. 37).); 2,000 in Mato Grosso; +100 guns; 10 aircraft; 11 tanks |

Casualties and losses
- At least 503 dead and 4,846 injured in the capital, see material and human damage

The São Paulo Revolt of 1924 (Portuguese: Revolta Paulista), also called the Revolution of 1924 (Revolução de 1924), Movement of 1924 (Movimento de 1924) or Second 5th of July (Segundo 5 de Julho) was a Brazilian conflict with characteristics of a civil war, initiated by tenentist rebels to overthrow the government of president Artur Bernardes. From the city of São Paulo on 5 July, the revolt expanded to the interior of the state and inspired other uprisings across Brazil. The urban combat ended in a loyalist victory on 28 July. The rebels' withdrawal, until September, prolonged the rebellion into the Paraná Campaign.

The conspiratorial nucleus behind the revolt consisted of army officers, veterans of the Copacabana Fort revolt, in 1922, who were joined by military personnel from the Public Force of São Paulo, sergeants and civilians, all enemies of the political system of Brazil's Old Republic. They chose the retired general Isidoro Dias Lopes as their commander and planned a nationwide revolt, starting with the occupation of São Paulo in a few hours, cutting off one of the arms of the oligarchies that dominated the country in "coffee with milk" politics. The plan fell apart: there were fewer supporters than expected and the loyalists resisted in the city's center until 8 July, when governor Carlos de Campos withdrew to the Guaiaúna rail station, on the outskirts of the city. The federal government concentrated much of the country's firepower in the city and began to reconquer it by the neighborhoods to the east and south, under the command of general Eduardo Sócrates.

São Paulo, the largest industrial park in the country, had its factories paralyzed by the fight, the most intense ever fought within a Brazilian city. There were food shortages and, in the power vacuum, the looting of stores began. The federal government launched an indiscriminate artillery bombardment against the city, which caused heavy damage to houses, industries and the inhabitants. Civilians were the majority of those killed and a third of the city's inhabitants became refugees. São Paulo's economic elite, led by José Carlos de Macedo Soares, president of the Commercial Association, did their best to preserve their properties and order in the city. Their representatives attempted to broker a ceasefire and, fearing a social revolution, distanced the leaders of the revolt from workers' movements, such as the anarchists, who had offered their support.

With no prospect of success in battle, the rebels still had an escape route into their occupied territory from Campinas to Bauru, but it was about to be cut off by loyalist victories in the Sorocaba axis. The revolutionary army escaped the imminent siege and moved to the banks of the Paraná River. After an unsuccessful invasion of southern Mato Grosso, they entrenched themselves in western Paraná, where they joined rebels from Rio Grande do Sul to form the Miguel Costa-Prestes Column. The federal government reestablished the state of emergency and in São Paulo a Department of Political and Social Order (Deops) was created. The movement went down in history as the "Forgotten Revolution" and does not have public celebrations equivalent to those held for the Constitutionalist Revolution of 1932.

== Background ==
=== The tenentist cause ===
Tenentes or lieutenants and senior officers of the Brazilian Army, veterans of the 1922 Copacabana Fort revolt, were the initial nucleus of subsequent revolts, including the one in São Paulo in 1924. Participation by the same individuals connects these moments, despite new supporters and agendas in the 1924 revolt. The rebellion also encompassed lower ranks of the army, military personnel from the Public Force of São Paulo, and civilians. Historiography addresses the tenentes as representatives of certain sectors of society (dissident oligarchies, middle classes) and also as a result of internal dynamics in the army. More concerned with military honor in 1922, two years later the tenentes had already developed a political vision beyond institutional issues.

These rebels or revolutionaries are more easily defined by what they were against than what they were for. The 1922 revolt wanted to prevent Artur Bernardes from taking office as President of Brazil; when this failed, its 1924 successor wanted him out of office. The issue was not so much the president himself, but what he represented: the hegemony of the agrarian oligarchies of São Paulo and Minas Gerais in Brazil's politics ("coffee with milk" politics), the power of local coronelism, electoral fraud, corruption, cronyism and favoritism in public affairs, all characteristic of politics in the Old Republic.

They were outraged by what they saw as the president's vengeful persecution of former members of the Republican Reaction, the coalition that faced him in the 1922 election. The president submitted Rio de Janeiro to federal intervention and Bahia to a state of emergency. In Rio Grande do Sul, Bernardes prevented the re-election of Borges de Medeiros as part of the Pact of Pedras Altas, which concluded the 1923 revolution. His government had authoritarian tendencies, beginning under a state of emergency and renewing it until December 1923. The 1922 rebels were subjected to a rigorous and arbitrary trial. The tenentes believed that the army was being used as a praetorian guard by the President of Brazil, shielding acts of dubious legality (such as the intervention in Rio de Janeiro) under the pretext of respecting discipline and hierarchy.

Unlike two years earlier, the rebels of 1924 made sure to expose some proposals for the new regime in manifestos and flyers. Their ambition was the "Republic that was not", a return to an ideal that would have existed in the Proclamation of the Brazilian Republic. To do so, they would break the dominance of the oligarchies over the electorate. The third manifesto published during the revolt (Note: Called Manifesto of the rebels of São Paulo in Viviani 2009, the documents appeared in the press on 10, 17 and 24 July.) advocated a reform of the Judiciary branch, giving it independence from the Executive; public education; and secret ballots with census suffrage. Illiteracy would be eradicated, but until that was possible, voting would be limited to the most enlightened.

This idea was taken further in an unpublished draft, (Note: An unsigned manuscript found by the police at Ricardo Hall's residence, at Travessa da Fábrica, No. 6. The police described it as the draft of a constitution (Meirelles 2002, p. 184-185). Viviani 2009, p. 122 calls it "Draft of the Constitution prepared by the rebels of São Paulo". According to Anita Leocádia Prestes, the document was in Isidoro Dias Lopes' personal archive.) proposing a "dictatorship" until 60% of the population was literate, and then a Constituent Assembly would be convened. This document does not necessarily represent the rebels' general opinion, but it demonstrates the influence of some authoritarian thinkers of the period, such as Oliveira Viana, for whom a strong State would be necessary to prepare the population for liberalism. Other conspirators thought of corporatism. There were a variety of reforms in mind, but they did not form a cohesive project. Not all participants were ideologically motivated; some cared more about their personal commitments, economic demands or dissatisfaction with their military career.

=== Veterans decide to fight again ===
It is not known for certain when conspiracies for a second tenentist revolt began, but in August 1922 there were already conspiracies in Rio de Janeiro, and in the same period, in Itu, in São Paulo. The atmosphere was tense and rumors circulated of further uprisings. Some rebel officers of 1922 considered the matter closed, and others, although unsatisfied, were waiting for the results of the judicial trial. Meanwhile, in 1923 the revolution in Rio Grande do Sul and the reopening of the Military Club rekindled political-military discussions. Many rebels awaited their sentence far from Rio de Janeiro, in conditions to join the conspiracy.

In December 1923, the courts indicted the 1922 rebels on Article 107 of the Penal Code ("to change by violent means the political Constitution of the Republic or the established form of government"). Until then, there was an expectation of amnesty; this procedure was traditional in previous military revolts. Precisely for this reason, the government wanted to discourage further uprisings. This refusal to grant amnesty was seen as yet another vindictive move.

Of the 50 indicted officers, 22 were already in prison and 17, disappointed, turned themselves in. The other 11 remained underground as deserters, notably captains Joaquim Távora, Juarez Távora and Otávio Muniz Guimarães and lieutenants Vitor César da Cunha Cruz, Stênio Caio de Albuquerque Lima, Ricardo Henrique Holl and Eduardo Gomes. These and other imprisoned, exiled, or clandestine officers formed a core of professional revolutionaries, for whom armed struggle seemed the only remaining option. A new rebellion would need to be more sophisticated than the previous one, without improvisation and simple barracks revolts. The final objective remained the seizure of power in Rio de Janeiro.

In the last months of 1923, some plotters were already sounding the possibility of an uprising in the south. In December, a plan to arrest War Minister Setembrino de Carvalho on his way through Ponta Grossa, Paraná, was discovered by the authorities. This plan would possibly be simultaneous to a coup d'état in Rio de Janeiro, led by colonel Valdomiro Lima. The government was already expecting a revolt, though not particularly in São Paulo. Over the course of several months, the president was already reading confidential reports about the conspiracy. In order to dismantle the conspiracy, officers were arrested or transferred to other garrisons, which was to some extent counterproductive, seeding discontent to distant regions. To demonstrate its strength, the government often placed troops at the ready, preventing officers from leaving their posts.

== Preparation of the uprising ==
=== São Paulo chosen as starting point ===
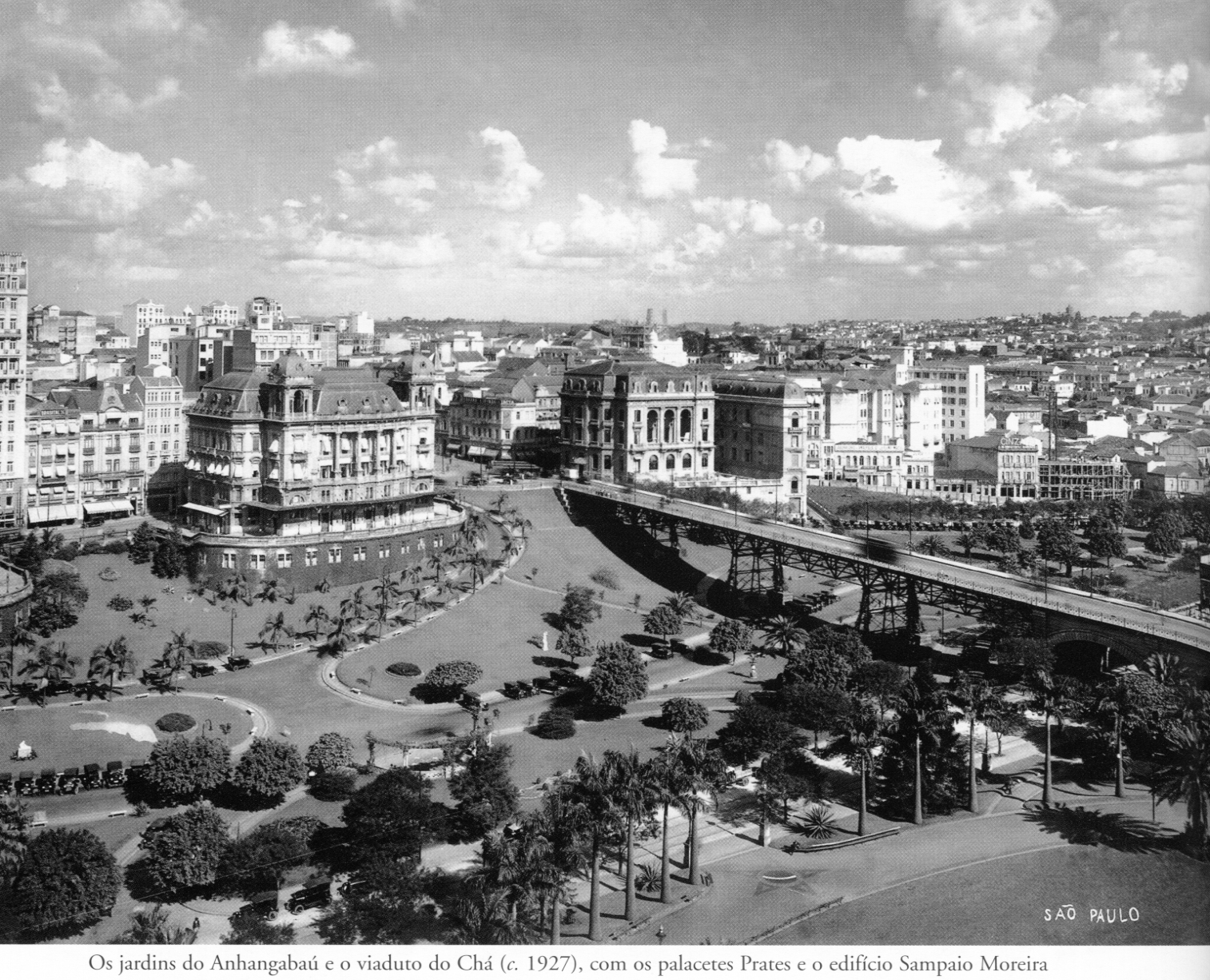
Viaduto do Chá in the 1920s

The rebellion intended by the conspirators would have a nationwide dimension, culminating in Rio de Janeiro. The starting point, São Paulo, was the circumstantial result of military planning. Therefore, the 1924 movement was not a paulista revolt. The initiative belonged to outsiders, and they cared little about São Paulo's political disputes.

In Rio, the largest military center in the country, surveillance and denunciation were constant, preventing it from being the starting point. The capital's political police, part of the 4th Auxiliary Police Bureau, was well organized, and the Chief of Police was marshal Carneiro da Fontoura, chosen by Artur Bernardes in place of the traditional law graduates. In contrast, the police apparatus was weaker in São Paulo, where the state government excessively trusted its Public Force, at the time stronger than the federal army garrison in the state. The possibility of taking the Public Force into rebellion was a decisive factor in the choice for São Paulo. The number of supporters in the army and in the Public Force and the correlation of military strength seemed favorable.

The city's rapid growth made it difficult to identify conspirators and fugitives. Its approximately 700,000 inhabitants in 1924 were ten times the 65,000 present in 1890. It was the capital of the richest state in the country and center of coffee-related commercial and banking activities. Initially linked to coffee production, rapid industrialization attracted many immigrants, to the point that foreigners and their descendants represented more than half of the local population. Urbanism and architecture imitated European metropolises, while poor neighborhoods sprawled unplanned on the periphery.

São Paulo had the best railroad connections in the country, through which Rio de Janeiro, then the federal capital, could be reached in a few hours. 22% of the country's railway network was concentrated in São Paulo at the beginning of the decade, and its capital was the junction to which the Paulista, Mogiana, Sorocabana, Santos-Jundiaí, Noroeste do Brasil and Central do Brasil railways converged. Its fall would have immense national repercussions, cutting off the strong arm of the federal government and coffee with milk politics, and providing the rebellion with "enormous military, economic and political resources".

In state politics, dominated by the Republican Party of São Paulo (PRP), the moment was delicate. Governor Washington Luís had forced Carlos de Campos as his successor, to the detriment of senator Álvaro de Carvalho, generating discontent. The artificial rise in the price of coffee increased the cost of living, leading to workers' strikes for wage adjustments. Since the 1917 general strike, the so-called "social question" was a major concern.

=== Clandestine networks ===
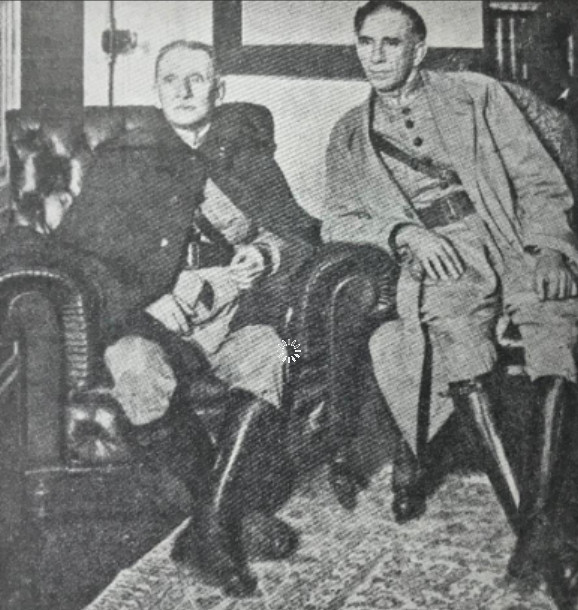
Isidoro Dias Lopes (left) and Miguel Costa

The clandestine conspirators worked civilian jobs under false identities. (Note: Aragão 2011, p. 174-175, and Aragão 2021, p. 145. For example, Juarez Távora became the electrician Otávio Fernandes, and Eduardo Gomes, the lawyer and primary school teacher Eugênio Guimarães.) To enlist new allies, including officers on active duty, they resorted to their relatives and contacts built in the Military School of Realengo and in the barracks, prisons and neighborhoods. It was normal for the rebels to be colleagues at the Military School, and many others met each other when arrested. Leaders traveled to barracks across most of the South and Southeast to build up support. The revolutionary central committee had a plan to enlist officers, which in the case of São Paulo began to be implemented in August 1923. The conspirators arrested in Rio de Janeiro found considerable freedom and corresponded with their comrades in São Paulo.

Meetings were held in the barracks themselves or in private homes; festivities also provided cover for contacts. In São Paulo, lieutenant Custódio de Oliveira's house on Vauthier Street, in Pari, served as the "Revolutionary HQ". Joaquim Távora, considered by João Alberto Lins de Barros as the "flag, brain and soul of the movement in its initial phase", lived there illegally. The meetings were attended, among others, by major Cabral Velho, inspector of Caçapava's 6th Infantry Regiment, captain Newton Estillac Leal, quartermaster of the 2nd Military Region, and lieutenants Asdrúbal Gwyer de Azevedo and Luís Cordeiro de Castro Afilhado, from the 4th Battalion of Caçadores. Custódio de Oliveira also rented a house on Estrada da Boiada, (Note: Currently Diógenes Ribeiro Avenue, in Pinheiros (Pinho 2014).) where rebel plotters hid weapons stolen from military units.

Other articulations took place in Travessa da Fábrica, in Sé, the residence of deserters Henrique Ricardo Holl and Victor César da Cunha Cruz. A unit of intense activity was the 4th Regiment of Mounted Artillery (RAM), from Itu, commanded by major Bertoldo Klinger, an officer of great prestige, who even agreed to assume a role in the revolutionary general staff. On 23 December 1923, his superior, general Abílio de Noronha, commander of the 2nd Military Region, questioned the news of a secret meeting in the unit; in response, he was assured that all officers were dispersed for the Christmas and New Year holidays. The general wanted to be impartial and chose not to pursue fugitive officers living clandestinely within his jurisdiction.

Plotters "studied" several senior officers in the Public Force. Since 1922, tenentism had already influenced officers of this institution, who added their own demands to the movement, such as the equalization of salaries with that of army officers. The great asset of the tenentists in São Paulo was the support of major Miguel Costa, inspector of the Public Force's Cavalry Regiment, a prestigious figure within and outside the institution and a friend of several army officers. Costa provided blueprints for barracks and public buildings, taking an active part in planning the occupation of the city.

To lead the revolt, the prestige of an older officer was needed, a role formerly played by marshal Hermes da Fonseca in 1922. Due to the post-1922 purges, the high-ranking officer corps on active duty no longer had rebel sympathizers. The officer they found was retired, general Isidoro Dias Lopes, who fulfilling their conditions: he was prestigious, uninvolved in 1922 and had the political ability to win civilian trust. Other names considered were the retired officers Augusto Ximeno de Villeroy, Odílio Bacellar Randolfo de Melo and, on active duty, Bertoldo Klinger and Miguel Costa. Conspirators in Rio de Janeiro considered Isidoro oblivious to the situation and preferred Klinger.

=== Sergeants and civilians ===
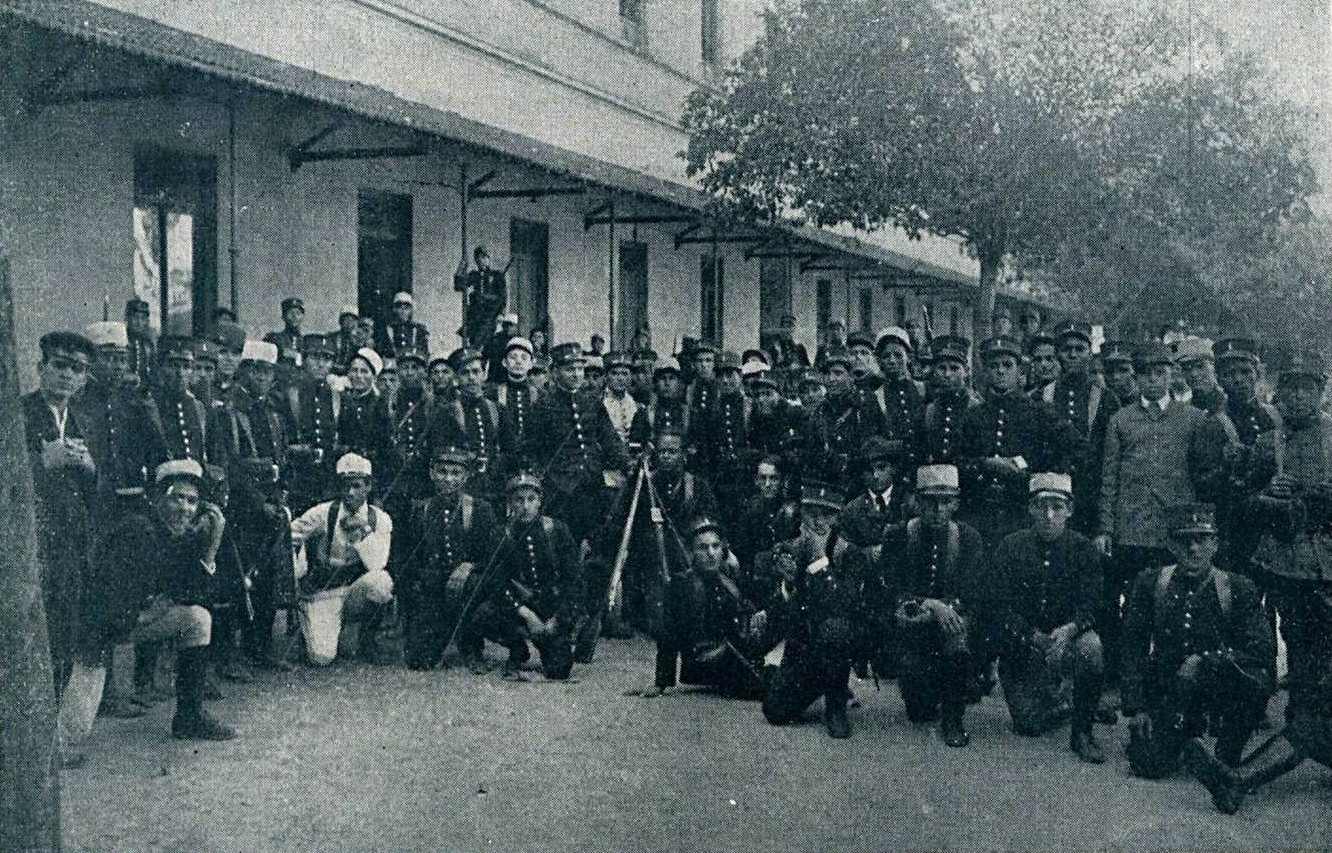
Soldiers of the Public Force of São Paulo

Historiography highlights lieutenants and senior officers in the revolt, stating, for example, that revolutionary propaganda was only made among the officers; from then on, sergeants, corporals and soldiers would only need to obey. However, the criminal trials opened after the 1924 revolt show sergeants within the conspiratorial nucleus. In this trial, sergeants were the majority of the military personnel indicted (59%) and convicted (47%); lieutenants are in second place. On the other hand, for the court, the lower ranks were accomplices, not heads of the plot. The sergeants' defenses excused participation in the rebellion as simple obedience to commanders' orders, sometimes by coercion, but promotions received by many within the revolutionary army suggested an active participation.

The movement was a military one, articulated from within the units, but because it aimed at power, it was of interest outside the barracks. Plotters contacted a number of civilians and counted on them to support their uprising after its outbreak in the military. This had difficulties, as plotting outside the military was riskier and there were prejudices against civilians. Defenders of this approach argued the presence of civilians is what would legitimize the movement and distinguish it from a mere barracks uprising.

Despite the tenentists' criticism of professional politicians, there was an alignment of interests with the Republican Reaction, whose leader, Nilo Peçanha, defended the 1922 rebels and had several meetings with Isidoro. An attempt was made to co-opt some dissidents from the São Paulo elite, such as Júlio de Mesquita and Vergueiro Steidel, but they did not want a revolution, much less one made by elements foreign to their class. To garner support among workers, Isidoro used Maurício de Lacerda and Everardo Dias as intermediaries. Plotters approached anarchist José Oiticica, socialist Evaristo de Morais and the Brazilian Cooperative Syndicalist Confederation.

=== Military planning ===
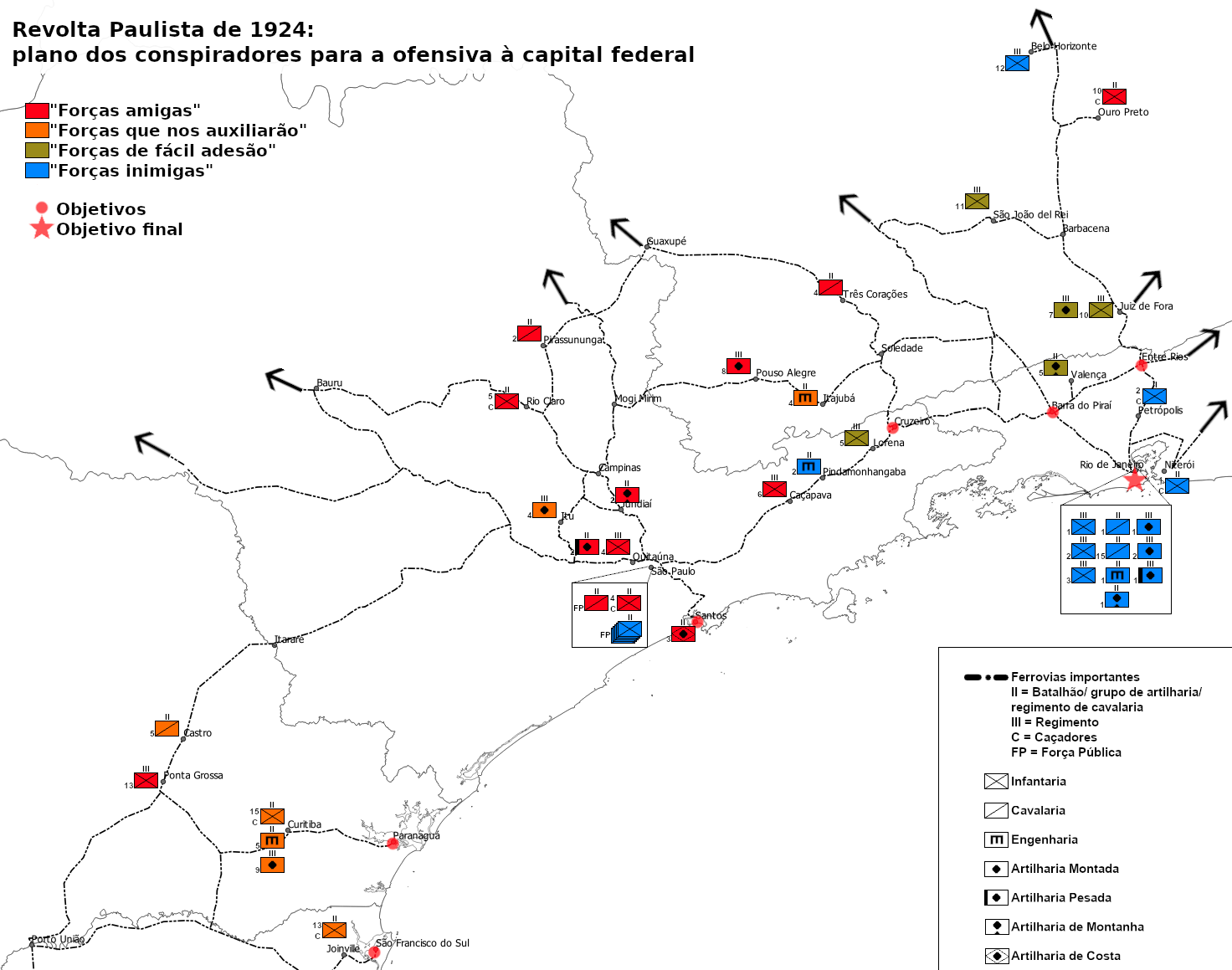
The units on which the conspirators hoped to count

Despite the improvisations in its execution, the 1924 uprising was planned in detail and at length. The conspirators took stock of the support across different units and classified them on maps as "friendly", "helpful", "easy to defect" and "enemy" forces. Under strict deployment schedules, these forces would concentrate at strategic points, controlling or destroying rail, telegraph, and telephone connections. The war would be violent and decisive; according to the plan, "cunning and mobility will be the preferred weapons". As long as the forces were outnumbered, they would avoid direct combat.

Outside São Paulo, the movement was expected in Minas Gerais, Paraná, Santa Catarina and Rio Grande do Sul, with isolated support in Mato Grosso, Goiás and Rio de Janeiro. In Paraná, Juarez Távora estimated the defection of 80% of the garrison, with enough officers to dominate the state, sympathy from the soldiers and civil support. The 1st Military Region as a whole, in Rio de Janeiro, was considered hostile, but there were written orders for the unit in Valença. For logistical reasons, there was no plan for a revolt in northern Brazil.

The plan stated that "the revolutionary movement will begin with the military takeover of the city of São Paulo, which must necessarily be consummated in a few hours". Participating units would be few, all from the city and the surroundings, to allow a quick and unexpected coup, leaving the loyalists without reaction. The next major objective would be Barra do Piraí, in the interior of Rio de Janeiro, to which a vanguard commanded by Joaquim Távora would hurry before dawn. It would consist of a battalion of 550 men from the 6th Infantry Regiment, from Caçapava. Reinforcement platoons would stay at the Cruzeiro and Barra Mansa junctions. One company would be deployed beyond Santana station, and another to Entre Rios. With the help of civilian elements, telephone and telegraph connections to Petrópolis and Além Paraíba would be cut. In 24 hours, the rebels would gather 3,870 men in Barra do Piraí; in 36 hours, that would be 5,494. They would be in control of the Serra do Mar gorges, through which the Central, Auxiliar, Leopoldina and Oeste railroads passed. The Federal District would be isolated, but the plan did not clarify how it would be occupied.

On other fronts, rebel units were expected to reinforce the offensive against Rio de Janeiro, or at least distract the government. To avoid a loyalist amphibious invasion, it would be necessary to occupy São Francisco do Sul, Paranaguá and Santos, or at least the Serra do Mar between Santos and São Paulo. In Rio Grande do Sul, the objective would be to prevent loyalist reinforcements from Porto Alegre to São Paulo.

=== Date setting ===
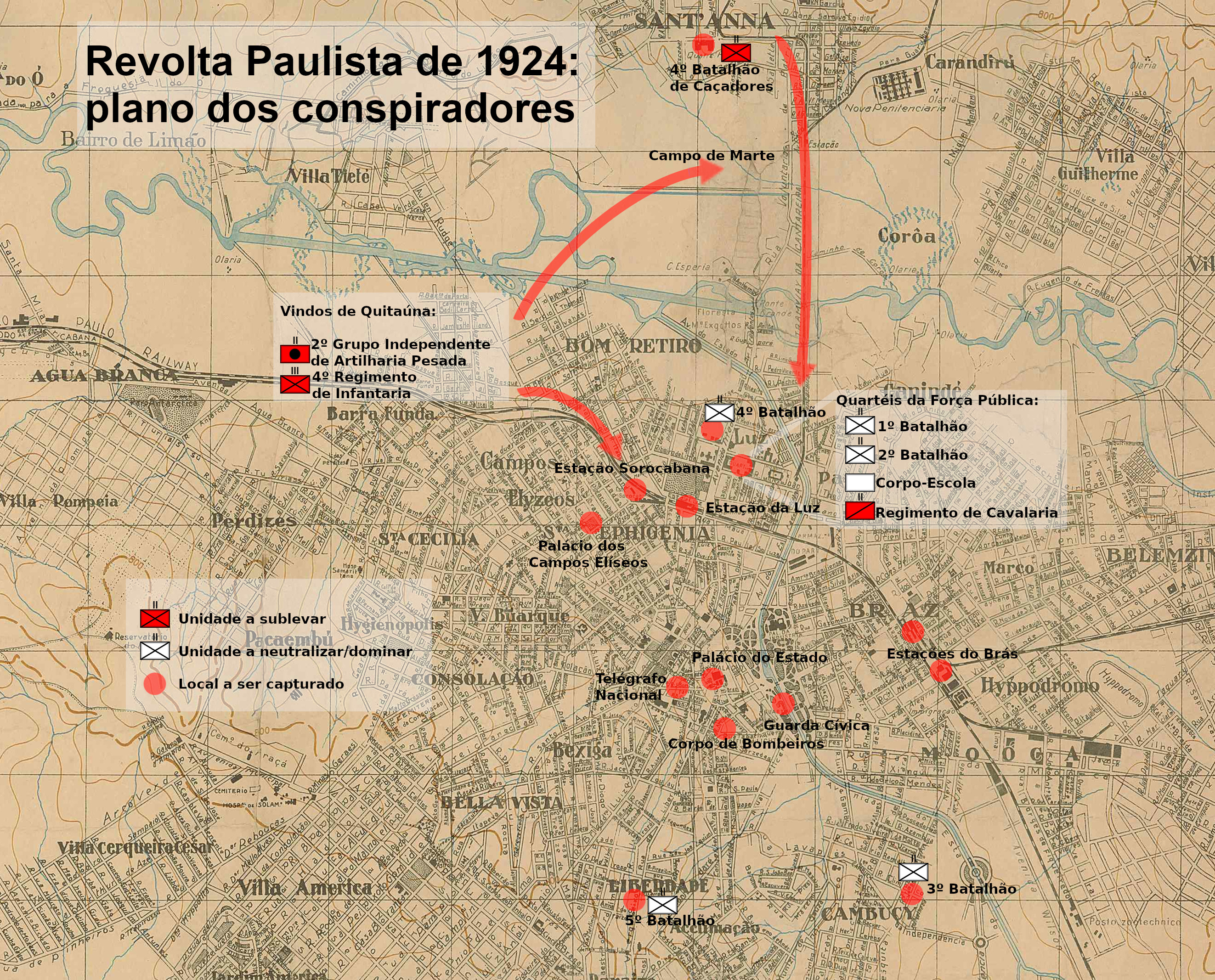
The part of the plan referring to the capital of São Paulo

Through 1924, conspiracy leaders met several times in Jundiaí and São Paulo to set starting dates for the movement. This definition, and the compromises of who would go first, were complicated. On 24 February, a faction led by Joaquim Távora advocated an early date, while another faction, represented by Bertoldo Klinger, considered the action premature. Távora's faction prevailed.

The chosen date, 28 March, would allow them to react to the imminent federal intervention in Bahia, where it would even have the support of governor J. J. Seabra. According to one of the police documents, Seabra himself financed the conspirators. But discussing collective decisions was very difficult, either because of inexperience or fear of repression. The plan had to be postponed due to Klinger, who withdrew from the conspiracy, and doubts about the loyalty of the 4th Infantry Regiment. To make matters worse, Klinger wrote a letter to Curitiba denying his participation and saying that there was nothing concrete in São Paulo. This was a disaster for the conspiracy in Paraná; according to Juarez Távora, the damage was doubled, as troops from Paraná would later come to fight the rebels. Seabra lost his government in Bahia and Nilo Peçanha died on 31 March, further dismaying the conspiracy. Without reliable support to the south, efforts were concentrated in São Paulo.

By this time, rumors of the revolt had already reached general Noronha, who demanded pledges of loyalty from his commanders. Meanwhile, the conspirators set new dates, but did not use any due to lack of guarantees from one or another unit. (Note: McCann 2009 cites 13 May, 28 May and 26 June; Carneiro 1965, p. 265 cites 25, 27 and 29 June and 1 and 3 July.) The date of 26 June was canceled due to the arrest of several fugitives in Rio de Janeiro. The surveillance of security agencies was increasingly stronger. The plotters almost lost two units, the 2nd Pack Artillery Group and the 5th Battalion of Caçadores, as the removal of their commanders was requested by Abílio de Noronha to the Ministry of War on 28 June. Before it was carried out, the revolt broke out.

On 30 June, Joaquim Távora put the conspirators in São Paulo on alert, warning them of the imminent arrival of "Severo" (Isidoro). Rumors of an uprising in Rio de Janeiro emerged on 2 July, but these were just inspections and transfers of military personnel to break up the conspiracy. On the same day, major Carlos Reis, former head of personal security for Artur Bernardes, came to São Paulo on a special mission. General Estanislau Pamplona, artillery commander in the state, ordered the Quitaúna batteries that the exercises outside the barracks should not last more than two hours and should not come closer to São Paulo than the neighborhood of Pinheiros. On 3 July, the revolutionary high command set the start date at zero hour on the 5th. This date, chosen in desperation, took advantage of the symbolism of the anniversary of the 1922 revolt. On the night of 4 July, Carlos de Campos conferred with army and Public Force officers to unify the diverse information they had about the conspiracy.

== Urban warfare sets in ==
On 5 July there was no march to Rio de Janeiro, and expected defections did not go as planned. Instead of a few hours, the fall of the city took four days, until governor Carlos de Campos withdrew to the Guaiaúna station, on the outskirts of the city. From a simple instrument in the plotters' plan, the city became a victim of urban warfare, the most intense in the history of Brazil, with scenes reminiscent of the First World War.

=== Execution of the plan ===
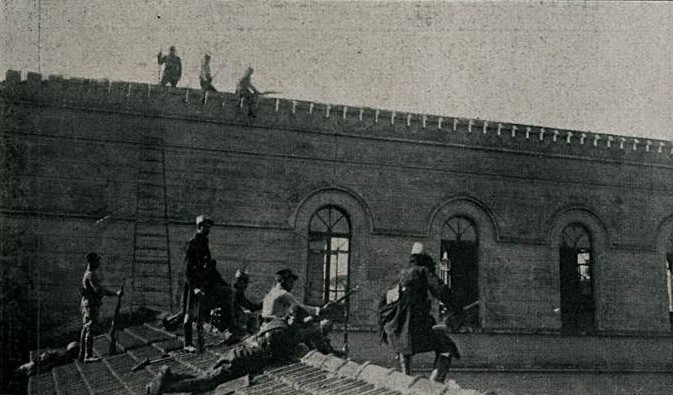
Rebels on the roof of the 1st BFP barracks, in Luz

At 04:30 in the morning of 5 July, general Noronha was notified that officers foreign to the garrison had moved 80 men from the 4th Battalion of Caçadores (BC), in Santana. The news was relayed to the state government and the Ministry of War. The rebel force was led to Luz, headquarters of the main barracks complex of the Public Force, which was occupied, without resistance, with Miguel Costa's action from the inside. General Isidoro installed the revolutionary command in the general headquarters of the Public Force, and command of that corporation was assumed by Miguel Costa. Detachments of the Public Force occupied the Sorocabana, Luz, Norte and Brás railway stations.

In the early hours of this movement, rebel officers won several victories without firing a shot, but to their surprise, the loyalists did the same. General Noronha went to the headquarters of the 4th Battalion of the Public Force (BFP), in Luz, where he dismissed about 30 soldiers from the 4th BC — and they obeyed. Imprisoned loyalist officers were released. General Noronha was arrested by the rebels on his way back to his headquarters. But the damage was done: Joaquim and Juarez Távora, Castro Afilhado and other rebels, not realizing that the battalion had changed sides, entered the building and were arrested.

In the words of Juarez Távora, "all the predictions laboriously discussed and weighed over several months would cruelly crumble, in a few hours, under the reality of insignificant unforeseen events". Reinforcements from Quitaúna's 4th Infantry Regiment (RI) stood still by the absence of their internal contact, lieutenant Custódio de Oliveira, whose missions were delayed by the delay in Isidoro's arrival at the capital and by a cannon wheel that passed over his foot. (Note: This unit later participated in the revolt (Castro 2022, p. 53), but in the early hours of 5 July the rebels were left with insufficient troops (DPH/Eletropaulo 1987, p. 31).) The conspirators forgot to cut telegraph and telephone communications, and the National Telegraph Bureau was occupied late and briefly. Lieutenant Ari Cruz, responsible for occupying the building, changed the guard to a company of the Public Force, not realizing that these "reinforcements" were loyalists.

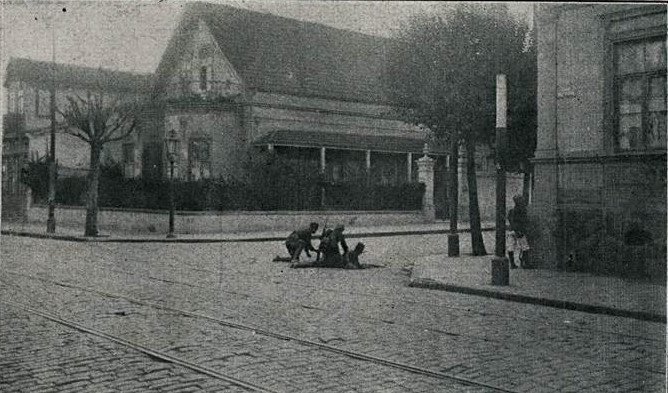
Attackers on the Campos Elíseos Palace position a machine gun

In Santos, plotters were left without guidance, also due to Isidoro's delay. There were telegrams with orders for captain lieutenant Soares de Pina, commander of the School of Sailor Apprentices and naval reservist training in Santos, and for lieutenant Luis Braga Mury, of the 3rd Coast Artillery Group of Itaipu Fort, both in the Baixada Santista. The telegrams were intercepted and uprising's leaders, arrested before they even received them.

In order to occupy the Government Palace, the conspirators relied on lieutenant Villa Nova — in reality, a government informant. (Note: Pinho 2014, p. 86-87. This palace, located in the historic center, close to the Secretariat of Public Security and Justice, should not be confused with the Campos Elíseos Palace.) The Campos Elíseos Palace, residence of the state president, had a guard of just 27 men, but they were already warned and managed to repel a first occupation attempt, at 7:30 am. A few hours later the rebels bombed the palace and, in the process, missed several shots and killed civilians in the vicinity. Carlos de Campos insisted on staying in place, even when targeted by the enemy, and received a large number of visits.

=== Results of the plan's failure ===
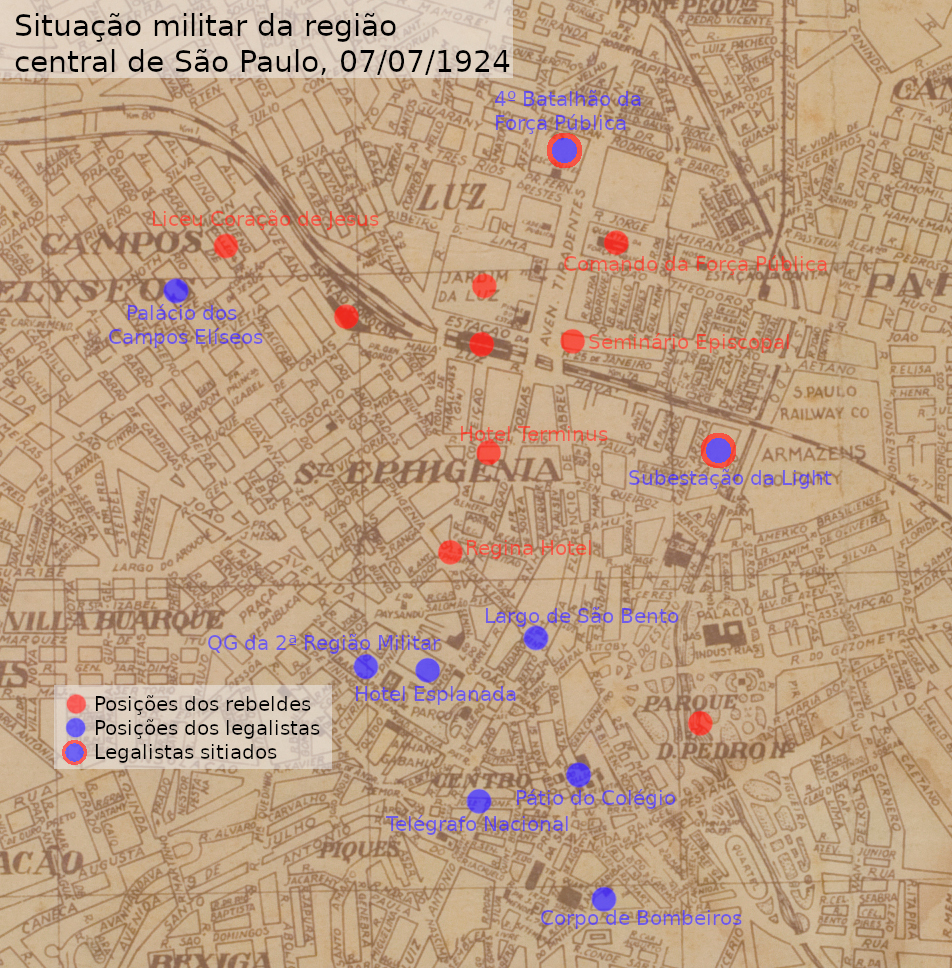
Military situation on 7 July

After these setbacks, the rebel command decided to concentrate on fighting inside São Paulo. This gave the federal government time to close the Itararé rail branch, the Baixada Santista and the Paraíba Valley. On 6 July, a Navy task force headed by the battleship Minas Geraes docked in Santos. (Note: The battleship was escorted by the destroyers Amazonas, Rio Grande do Norte, Alagoas and Mato Grosso, of which the first two arrived on the same day. These ships formed the Exercise Squadron. (Mendonça 1997, p. 100).) On the following day, loyalist reinforcements from Minas Gerais and Rio de Janeiro led by general Eduardo Sócrates gathered in Barra do Piraí. Sócrates established his headquarters in Caçapava, later transferred to Mogi das Cruzes, with a command post further on in Guaiaúna. Army loyalists occupied São Caetano, between Santos and São Paulo.

The fighting spread in São Paulo, approaching the center, where the Anhangabaú valley and the Paissandu, Santa Ifigênia and São Bento squares were fought over. Scattered groups of fighters fought across the tops of buildings and hills. In the 4th BFP, forty loyalists were still under siege. Positions were won and lost, and the situation remained indefinite. On 7 July, 70 loyalists attacked the southeastern flank of the revolutionary forces' heartland, the barracks of Luz. They were repulsed and besieged at the Light power plant, where they were still a threat.

By the morning of 5 July, both sides had approximately 1,000 fighters. Defections outside São Paulo, with a direct effect on the struggle, only occurred in some units of the 2nd Military Region, and even then, belatedly. On the 6th, the loyalists received reinforcements from the army, but part of them (the 6th Infantry Regiment and a company from the 5th Infantry Regiment) joined the revolt. On 7 July, Further reinforcements from the army, the Public Force and a contingent of sailors arrived on the following day, but neither side achieved decisive numerical superiority.

=== Consequences for the population ===
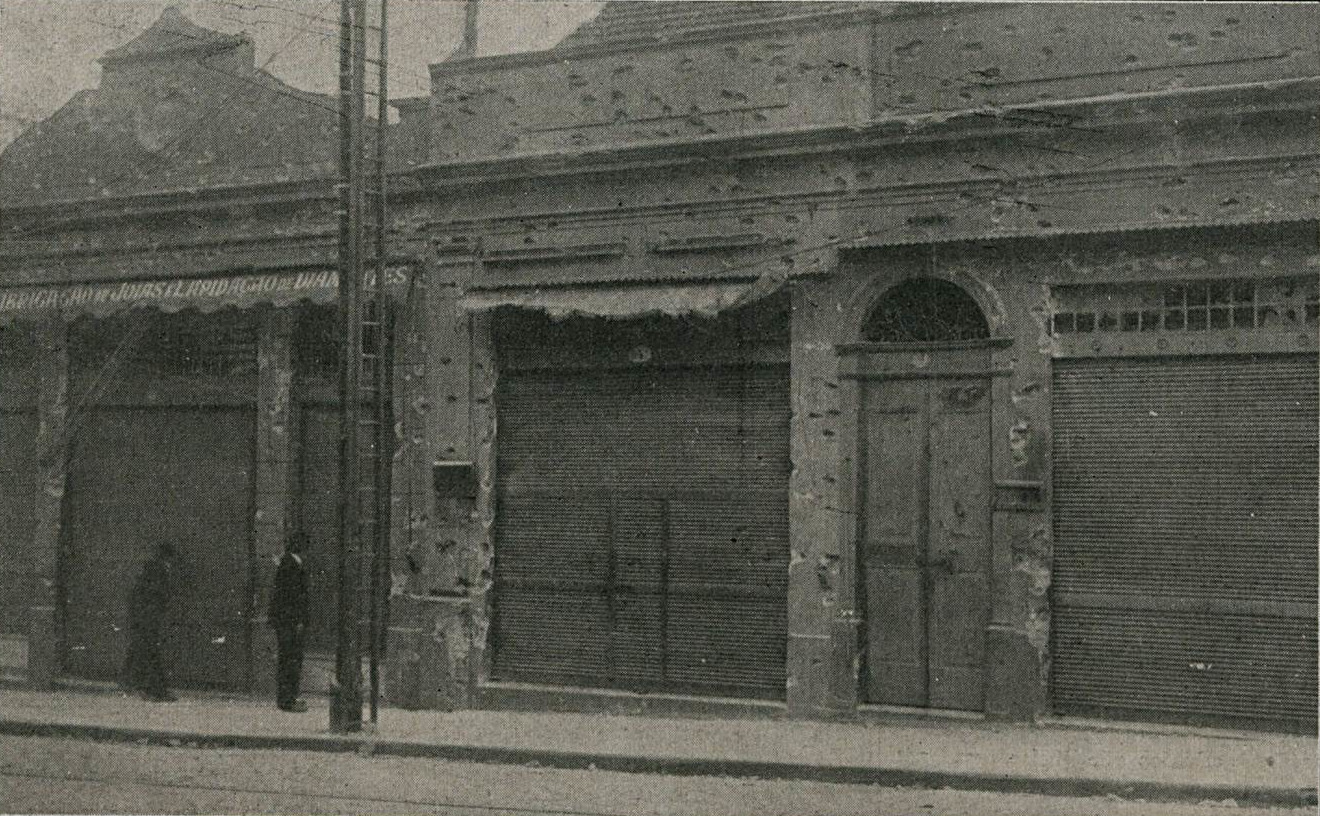
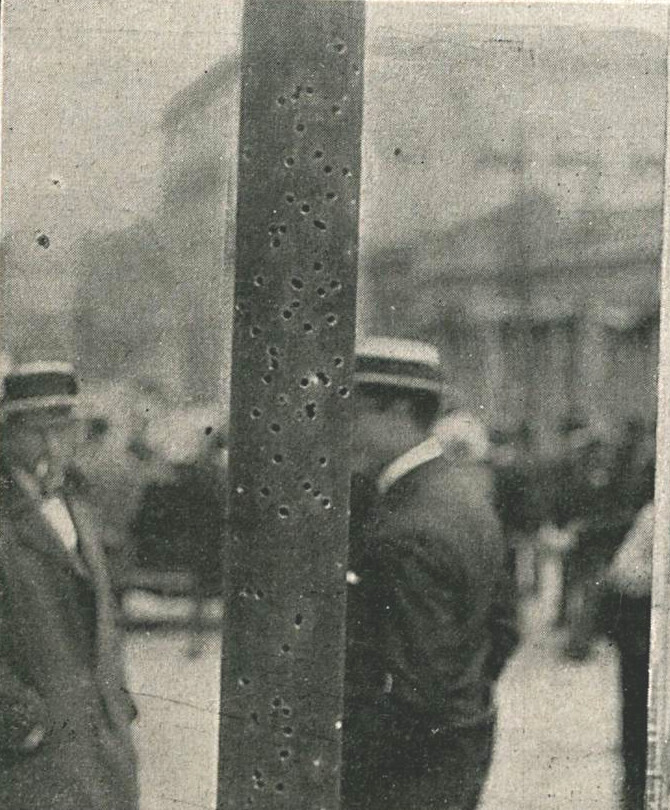
People contemplate the result of a shooting on Rua Florêncio de Abreu

The morning of 5 July began like any other for civilians, but the sound of gunfire soon scared inhabitants of the center. Going out into the street in hot spots was too dangerous, and for safety, their residents stayed at home. Many were unable to reach their destination because of the fighting. Trenches proliferated across the landscape; in all, 309 were built in the city. The population was unaware of the leaders and objectives of the revolt, and it was difficult to identify which side fighters belonged to; Army and Public Force uniforms were of different colors, but there were rebels and loyalists in both corporations. The setting of war in the center on 8 July was described by Estado de S. Paulo journalists Paulo Duarte and Hormisdas Silva as follows:

We could not go down the slope of São João, towards the Red Cross, on Rua Líbero, because of the firefight that the forces of captain Guedes da Cunha sustained, from the top of the slope, in Praça Antônio Prado, with the rebel forces in Largo do Paissandu. Through São Bento square, impossible to pass. The fusillade there was more intense. We left the car in front of the Estado's office and, close to the walls, we ventured down the slope. A few bullets whistled around us.

Raw materials for the factories and foodstuffs from the interior could hardly arrive, as the train stations were occupied. As a result, factories came to a standstill and the distribution of goods was disorganized. Almost everything stopped — most businesses, trams, schools and government offices. The phones and power supply still worked, but poorly. Private vehicles were requested by both sides, and civilians were forcibly recruited. Few newspapers circulated, as paper, energy, and even employee movement were limited. Both the government and rebels censored the press.

By 9 July, food shortages were already being felt. Bakeries could not get flour, and milkmen turned back when they found trenches. Bars, restaurants, and cafes operated behind closed doors for fear of stray bullets. The population tried to stock as much food as possible, but warehouses only accepted payment in cash, and the federal government, fearing a run on the banks, declared a holiday until the 12th.

=== Withdrawal of the state government ===
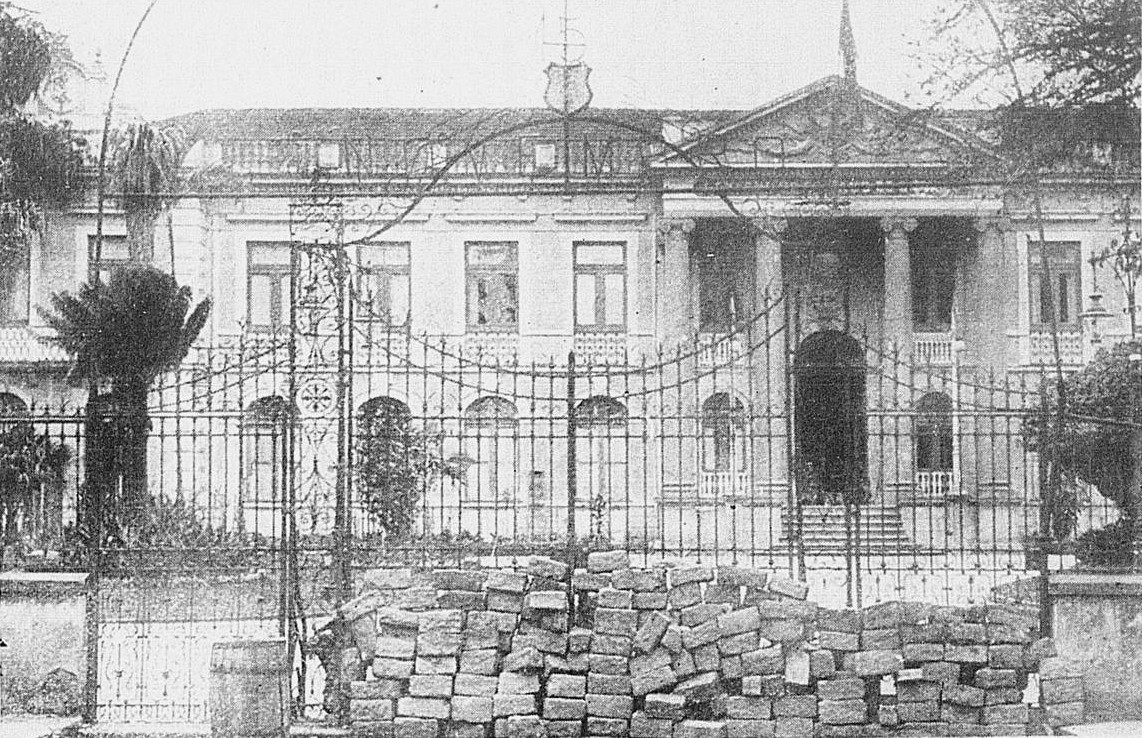
Barricade in the Government Palace, in Pátio do Colégio, abandoned by the loyalists

In Campos Elíseos, the rebels conquered positions closer to the government's palace on 7 July and on the next day carried out a new, more effective bombardment. Advised by general Estanislau Pamplona to withdraw to a safer location, governor Carlos de Campos went to the Pátio do Colégio complex of government buildings, where police and sailors were concentrated. This place was equally harassed by rebel artillery, which did not know of the governor's decision, but noticed the concentration of high-ranking officers. Oswald de Andrade mocked the situation: "for the first time in military history, instead of the bullet looking for the target, it was the target that looked for the bullet".

The governor again withdrew, this time to the Guaiaúna railway station, in Penha, the last of the Central do Brasil that still communicated with Rio de Janeiro. It also had loyalist reinforcements commanded by general Eduardo Sócrates. The governor was housed in a special locomotive belonging to the railroad administration, which served at the same time as a mobile headquarters and provisional seat of the state government.

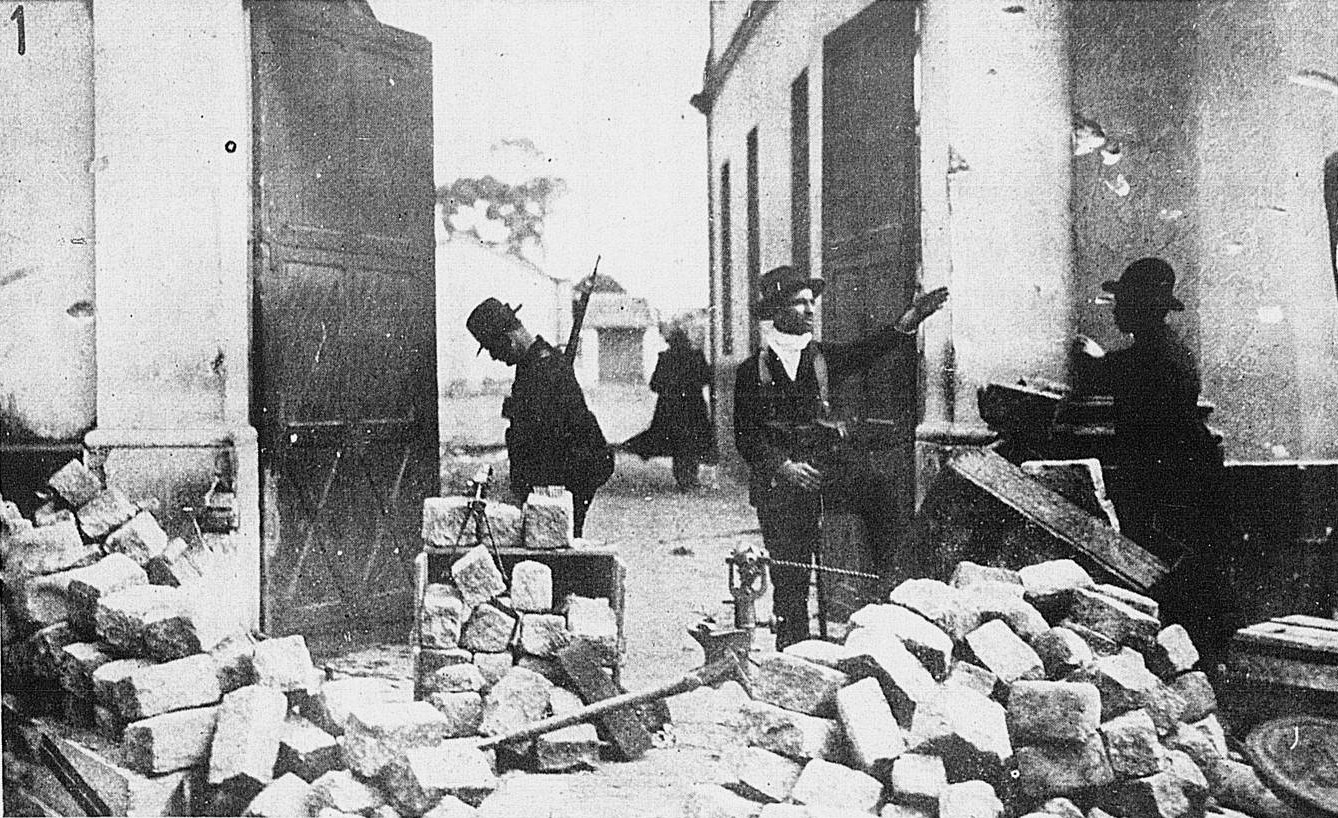
Rebels at the gate of the 4th BFP

By this time morale in the rebel leadership was at an all-time low. General Isidoro, noting the troops' exhaustion and fearing mass desertions, wanted to withdraw the entire revolutionary army to Jundiaí. Miguel Costa insisted on continuing the fight in the urban terrain to which the troops were accustomed. Isidoro ordered the withdrawal for the morning of 9 July, but Miguel Costa spent the night organizing the defenses. He wrote a letter to the governor, taking full responsibility for the uprising and asking for amnesty in exchange for his surrender. If his conditions were not accepted, he would fight to the end. But there was no one to receive the letter; on the morning of the 9th, the government's palace was empty. Its ruins soon filled with curious folk.

Not only the governor, but also loyalist forces abandoned their positions or surrendered. Isidoro, although victorious, considered resigning, resentful of Miguel Costa's insubordination, but the latter convinced him to remain at the head of the movement. The rebels celebrated this turn of events, considered by Isidoro to be a work of chance rather than a military feat. Many years after the conflict, the decision to withdraw was still controversial; the rebels "were so certain of defeat, and yet they received, on a silver platter, the target that they considered unattainable". According to Abílio de Noronha, loyalist commanders abandoned their subordinates, causing a disorderly retreat.

== Occupation of São Paulo ==
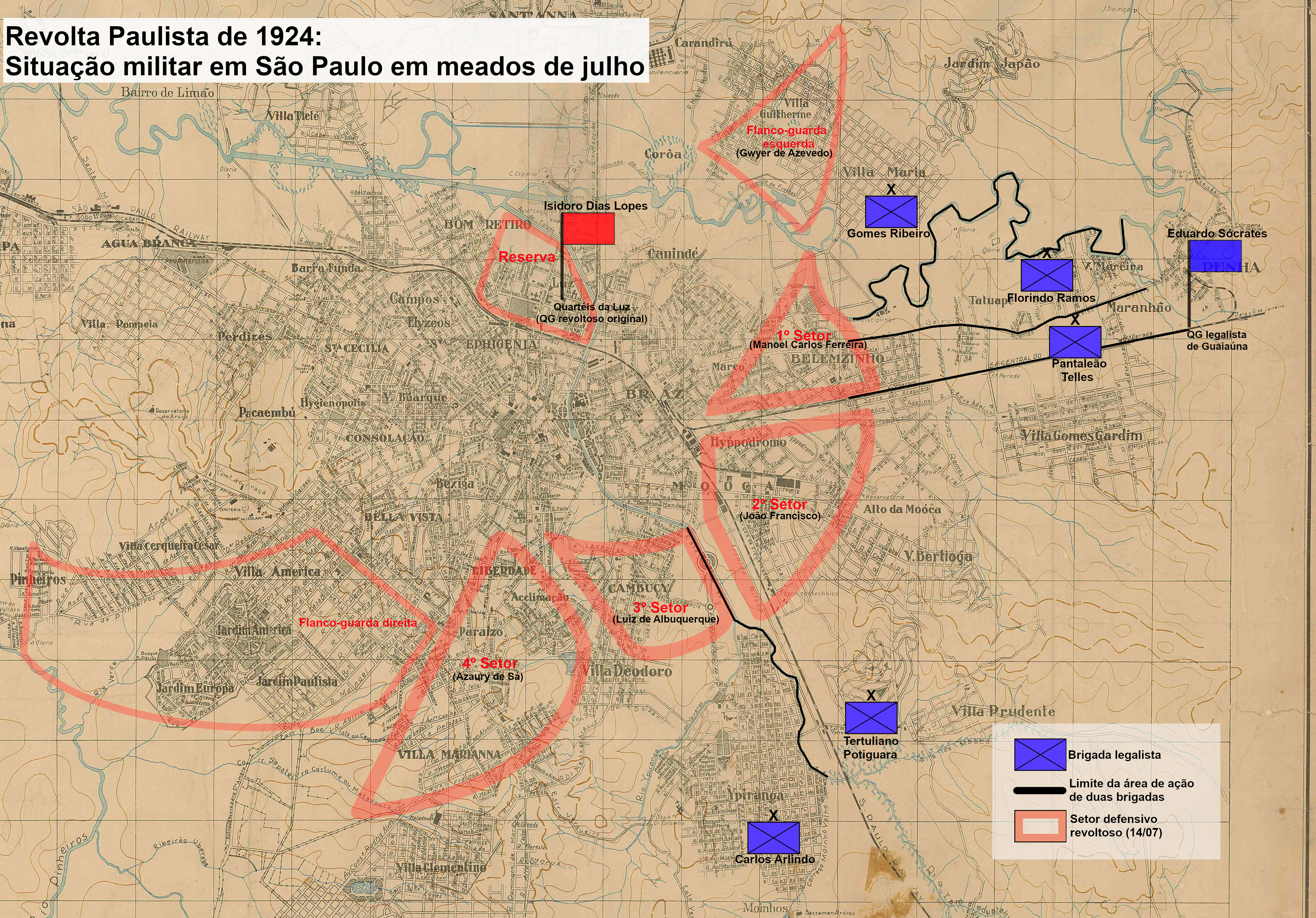
Distribution of opposing forces around 14 July

After the departure of the state government, for a moment the city appeared to return to normality, as hostilities were momentarily interrupted. The rebels did not take advantage of their enemies' low morale at the time of withdrawal and did not carry out their offensive plans. If there was any illusion that the city would function normally, leaving them to deal only with the military front, it was shattered. The city was bombed, the population looted the warehouses and fires consumed the factories. In addition to resisting the new loyalist offensive, the revolutionary command had to deal with the suffering of the population and reorganize the government, ceding responsibilities to civilians.

=== Power vacuum ===
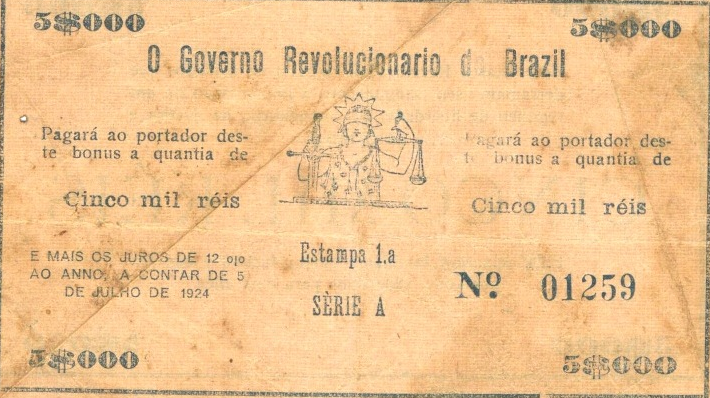
War bonds issued by the "Revolutionary Government of Brazil"

General Isidoro proclaimed himself head of a "provisional government". The state government was expelled from its headquarters, but this was not the original objective of the revolutionaries; if the Campos Elíseos Palace had been occupied without resistance, they would possibly have kept Carlos de Campos in power. General Isidoro declared in a manifesto that the revolution had no regional or personal objectives; the movement was solely against the federal government. Thus, mayor Firmiano de Morais Pinto was kept in office. His responsibilities increased, filling the gap left by the state government. This attitude contrasted with that of the municipal legislature, whose councilors did not meet at any time during the conflict.

Respecting the mayor's term showed weakness, but allowed the rebels to focus their attention on the military front. More than a tactical maneuver, the decision can be interpreted as coherence. Firmiano Pinto was tasked with offering Fernando Prestes de Albuquerque, vice-president of São Paulo, to take the place of the governor expelled from Campos Elíseos. Prestes replied that "he would accept the government transmitted by Dr. Carlos de Campos by his own free will and never by the hands of the revolutionaries"; the mayor agreed. This refusal was no surprise; the vice-president was a powerful coronel from Itapetininga, with a known allegiance to the Republican Party of São Paulo, and he was organizing a loyalist resistance in the interior. The rebels then offered the government to José Carlos de Macedo Soares, president of the Commercial Association of São Paulo, in a triumvirate with lieutenant leaders, but he refused.

=== Looting of stores ===
Living conditions continued to deteriorate:

Countless dead and wounded enter the blood hospitals. Garbage accumulates in the streets. Filth reigns. Despite the fixed prices for foodstuffs, hunger prevails, like an immobilizing plague. (...) In various parts of the city, dead and abandoned horses are displayed. A pestilent smell invades the air, foreshadowing an epidemic, and tortures the nose...

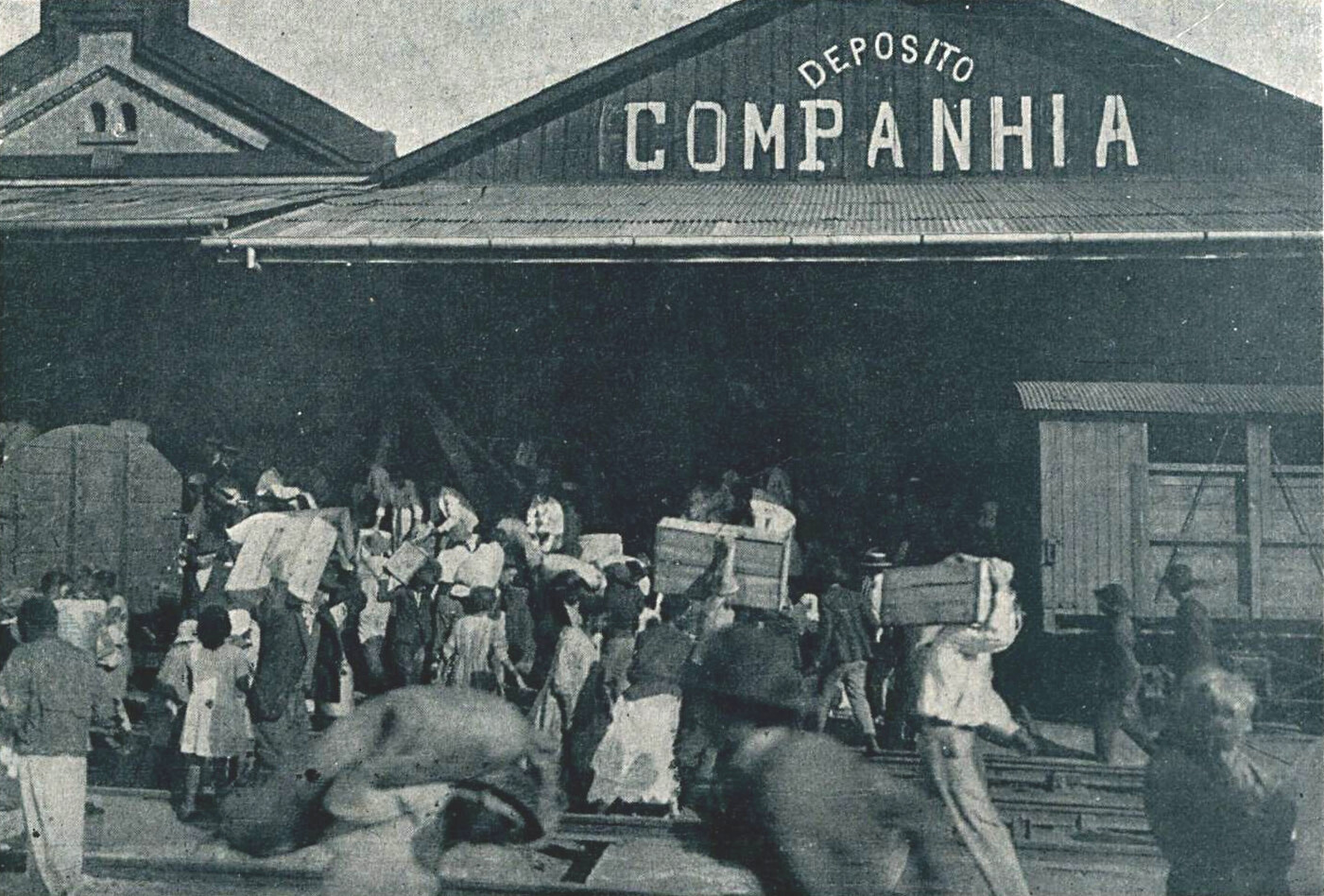
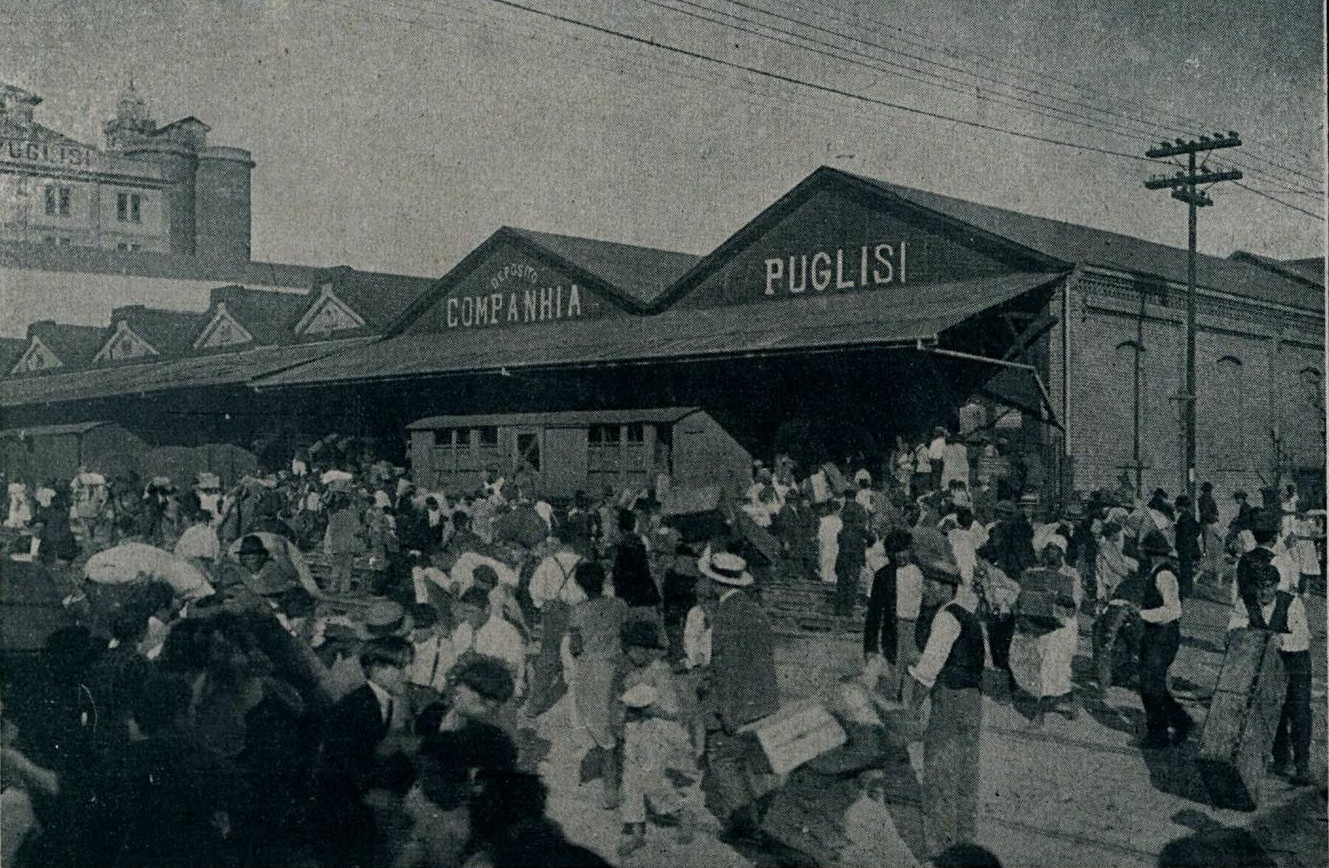
Looting of the Puglisi Company deposit

Starving, working-class families noticed the lack of policing. On 9 July, a wave of popular looting of commercial establishments began in the farthest neighborhoods (Mooca, Brás and Hipódromo), later reaching the center. The city's government recorded 61 looted establishments, 6 looted and set on fire, and 6 robbed throughout the month. Almost all shops, emporiums, and warehouses were attacked. The most affected companies were Sociedade Anônima Scarpa, Matarazzo & Cia, Ernesto de Castro, Nazaré e Teixeira, Motores Marelli, Maheifuz & Cia, Moinho Gamba, Moinho Santista, Reickmann & Cia and J.M. Melo.

Oxen loaded onto a Central do Brasil train were released, slaughtered and quartered in the street. In the factories and mills of the Matarazzo family, in Brás, Italian orators spoke during the sacking, calling the owners "usurers and exploiters of the people". About this case, José Carlos de Macedo Soares reported that the crowd "carried every last board of the shelves, breaking the glass, making the scales, cabinets, display cases and counters unusable, everything was broken and carried away".

The looting had a moral dimension, expressing popular indignation at rising prices and previous discontent with their bosses. Some of the industries that suffered the greatest looting, such as Matarazzo and Gamba, had experienced strikes in January and February of the same year. Looting was also a way to satisfy hunger and, for some, to make easy profits. Witnesses saw all sorts of goods being carried, such as crockery, silk stockings, typewriters, and electrical wires, not just food. Even the journal A Plebe, a periodical with a less negative view of the looting, noted "many people who took advantage of the occasion without being in need, as well as a lot of wastage and spoilage of food".

Both men and women participated, and little coordination and planning was required. It is not known for sure who started the lootings; they may have been a spontaneous movement, but some sources attribute their initiation to João Cabanas, a lieutenant in the revolutionary army. In his account, Cabanas claimed to have caught and shot two looters in the act. Finding the Municipal Market surrounded by an angry crowd, he ordered the doors to be broken down and the goods distributed to the poor, taking care only to avoid abuse, which was not entirely possible. According to the judicial trial, the rebels began looting to supply their troops, and the people seized the opportunity. There is also a report of a popular sack supported by the loyalist army in Vila Mariana.

In this sense, there was acquiescence from the rebels with the attacks on commercial buildings, but the leaders distanced themselves from any looting or depredations, promising to arrest the rioters, and at the same time, demanding that merchants not exaggerate in prices. Cavalry from the Public Force patrolled the streets, and Army soldiers guarded banks, large export companies, and diplomatic representations. The Revolutionary Police Command, headed by major Cabral Velho, demanded the return of the looted items, threatening to arrest those responsible based on photographs and denunciations.

=== New frontlines ===
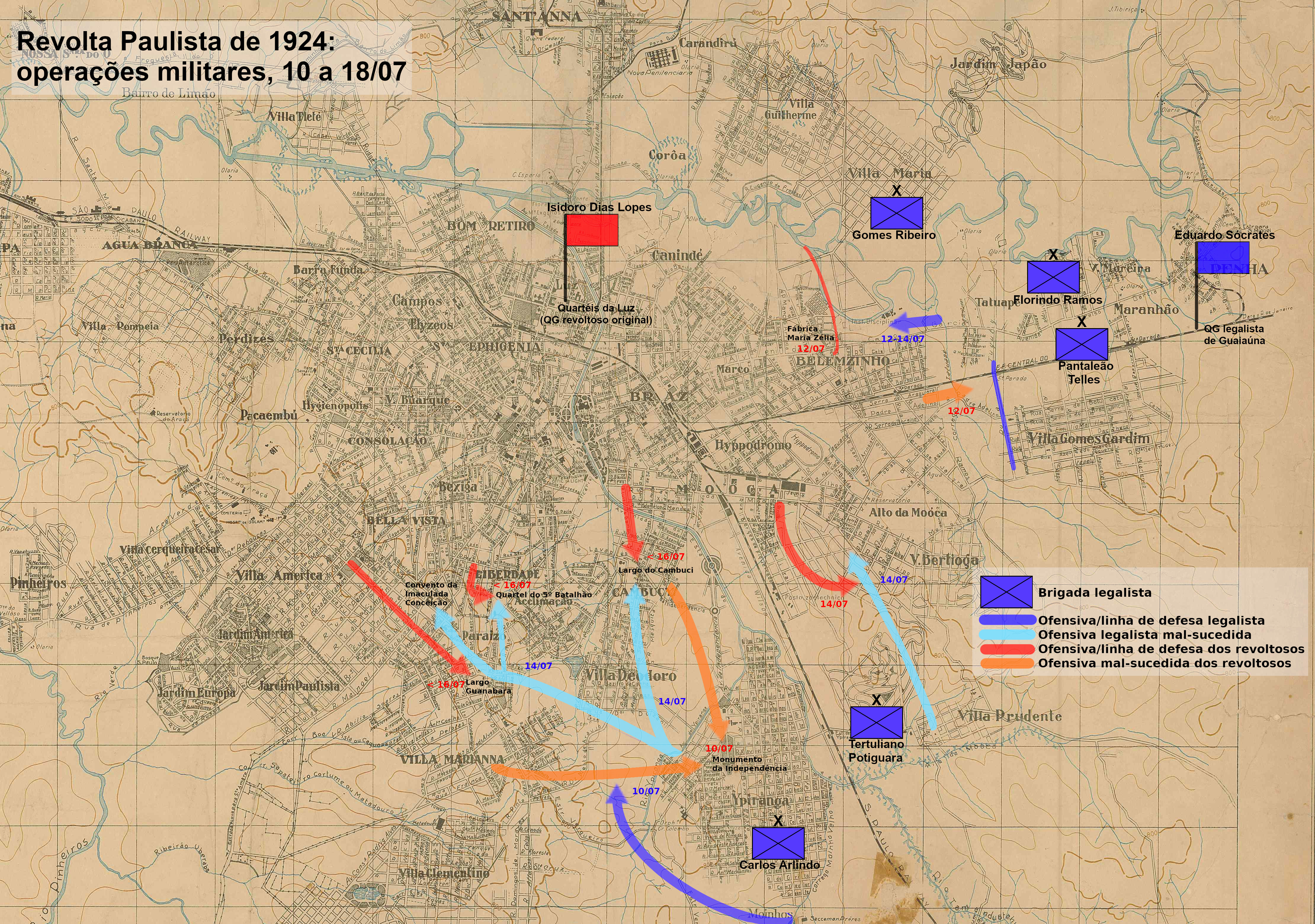
First maneuvers on the periphery

Much of the country's combat strength was sent to São Paulo. Loyalist reinforcements from the Army and the Public Forces, coming from several states, expanded the loyalist army to 14–15 thousand men by mid-month, armed with the most modern equipment of the Armed Forces. The rebels were outnumbered by five to one, with at most 3 to 3,500 effective fighters. The loyalists organized themselves into a division commanded by general Sócrates and composed of five infantry brigades and one divisional artillery brigade. The rebels divided into four defensive sectors and two flank guards.

The loyalists came from Rio de Janeiro, via the Central do Brasil railway, and from Santos via the São Paulo Railway, conditioning their distribution in a semicircle extended from Ipiranga, to the south, to Vila Maria, to the east. The front line thus fell in working-class neighborhoods on the periphery. According to general Sócrates, enemy defensive positions were strong. General Noronha had the opposite opinion, emphasizing the precariousness of the street barricades. But several sources emphasize the defensive value of some points, notably factories. (Note: "They encountered resistance from revolutionary formations entrenched in the open spaces on the outskirts, in the access roads to the city center and even in the factories, whose chimneys served as excellent observation posts." (Cohen 2007). According to João Cabanas (A Coluna da Morte, Editora da Unesp, 2014), the Cotonifício Crespi, which he came to defend, "dominates the entire height of Mooca", and the tower of the Maria Zélia factory was the "most important position in the sector".)

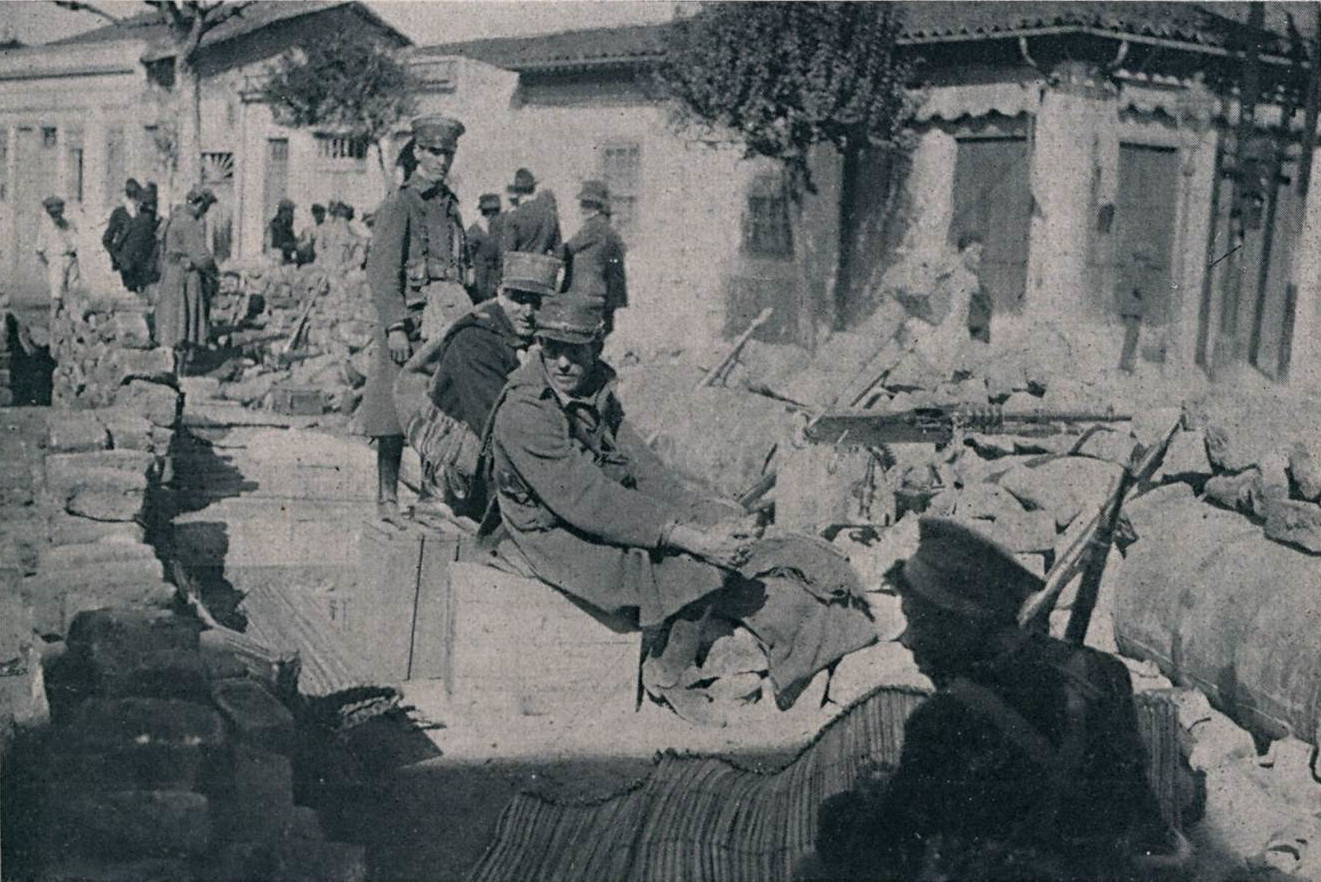
Position of the rebels on Rua da Liberdade

At Ipiranga, the Arlindo brigade left its left flank exposed to an attack from Cambuci and Vila Mariana on 10 July, but managed to repel the offensive. With its right flank secured by advances from the Tertuliano Potiguara brigade in Mooca, the Arlindo brigade occupied positions in Cambuci and Liberdade on 14 July. Meanwhile, on the banks of the Tietê River, the Florindo Ramos brigade had its advance blocked by the defenders of the Maria Zélia Factory.

According to Abílio de Noronha, coordination between the loyalist brigades was very precarious, leaving flanks exposed to rebel attacks. Applying the principle of concentration of forces, the rebels kept a large part of their strength as a motorized reserve. Thus, on 14 July, the Potiguara brigade advanced too far, exposed its flanks and was forced to retreat. This exposed the flanks of the Telles and Arlindo brigades, respectively to its right and left. By 16 July, the Arlindo brigade's gains were reversed. During this counteroffensive, the rebels suffered a great loss: Joaquim Távora was mortally wounded in the attack on the barracks of the 5th BFP, in Liberdade.

=== Loyalist bombardment ===
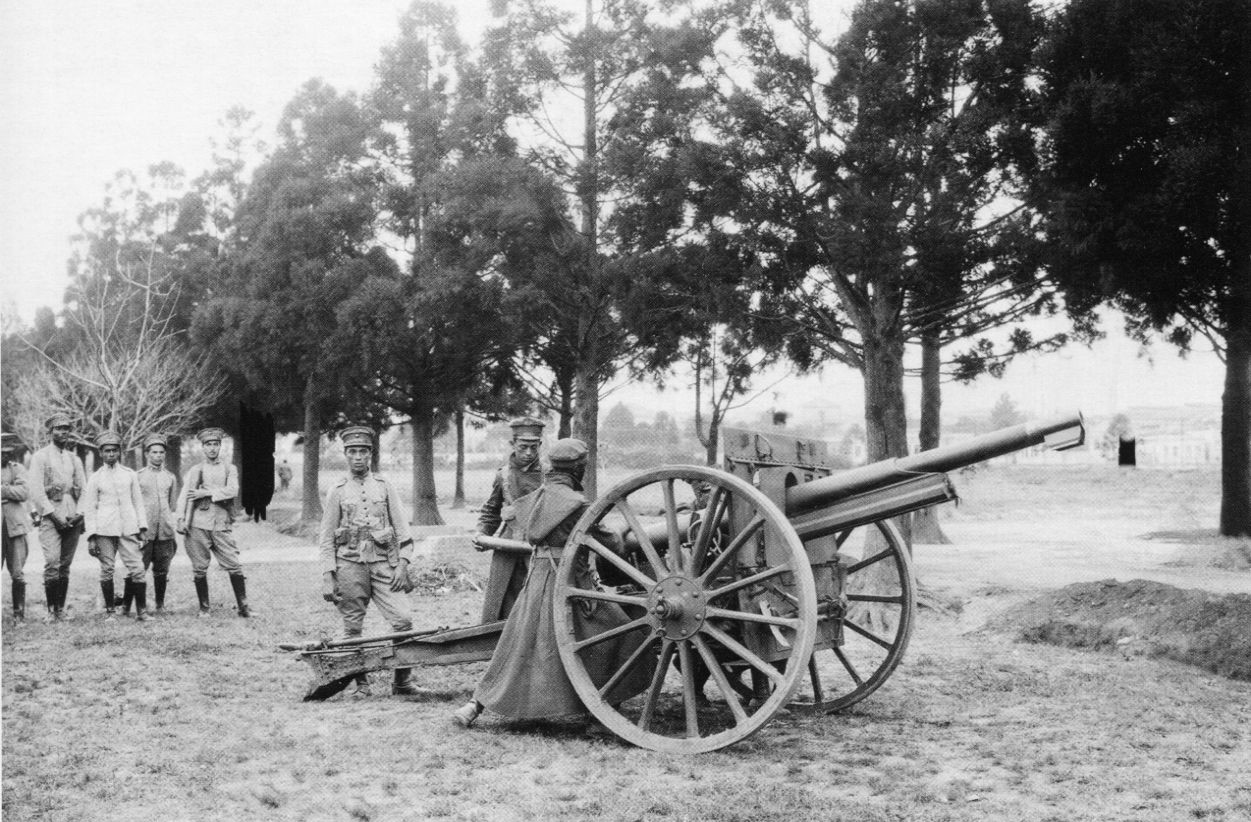
Loyalist 75 mm gun

Artillery fire was the main cause of death in the conflict. The government had a material advantage in this armament, with numerous, more modern and larger caliber guns. Against about 20 Krupp guns of 75 and 105 millimeters, the loyalists had more than a hundred Krupp, Schneider and Saint-Chamond guns, including 155 millimeter howitzers. The insurgents' artillery could not compete with the government's longer-ranged guns, well positioned on the ridges around the city.

On 8 to 9 July, loyalist artillery attacked Luz, where the revolutionary headquarters was located, and Brás. The bombardment intensified from the 10th to the 11th, also hitting Mooca and Belenzinho. Many other neighborhoods were hit throughout the month, such as Liberdade, Aclimação, Vila Mariana, Vila Buarque, Campos Elíseos, Paraíso and Ipiranga. The hardest hit were Luz and the working-class neighborhoods of the east, but the wealthier residential neighborhoods, while much less affected, were not spared. The bombardment was continuous, day and night; on 22 July, 130 artillery shells were fired per hour.

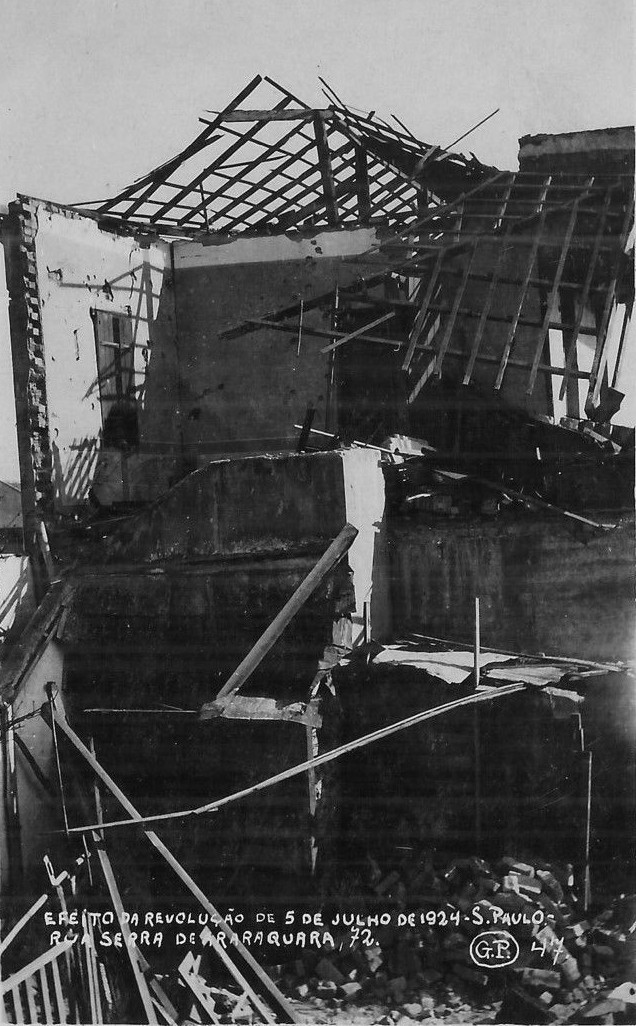
Destroyed house on Serra de Araraquara street

Densely populated areas devoid of military targets were hit. The shells collapsed walls and roofs, destroying the houses. Terror dominated the population, who took refuge in cellars. Civilians were the majority of those killed. An emblematic case was the Teatro Olympia, in Brás: although located half a kilometer from the nearest trench, it was hit on the 15th, burying dozens of homeless families. The government did not seem to mind the collateral damage. The rebels also showed little regard for civilian casualties, but caused much less damage.

Many industries were damaged, such as Companhia Antarctica Paulista, Biscoitos Duchen, and Moinhos Gamba. Most shocking was the symbol of São Paulo's industrial power, the Cotonifício (Cotton Factory) Crespi, which housed rebel troops and displaced families. It was set on fire as many as five times and partially destroyed. By the 22nd, plumes of smoke were visible for miles around. Fires consumed several parts of the city, attributed to both bombing and looting. The Criminal Court was also set on fire, which may have been a destruction of records, unrelated to the bombing.

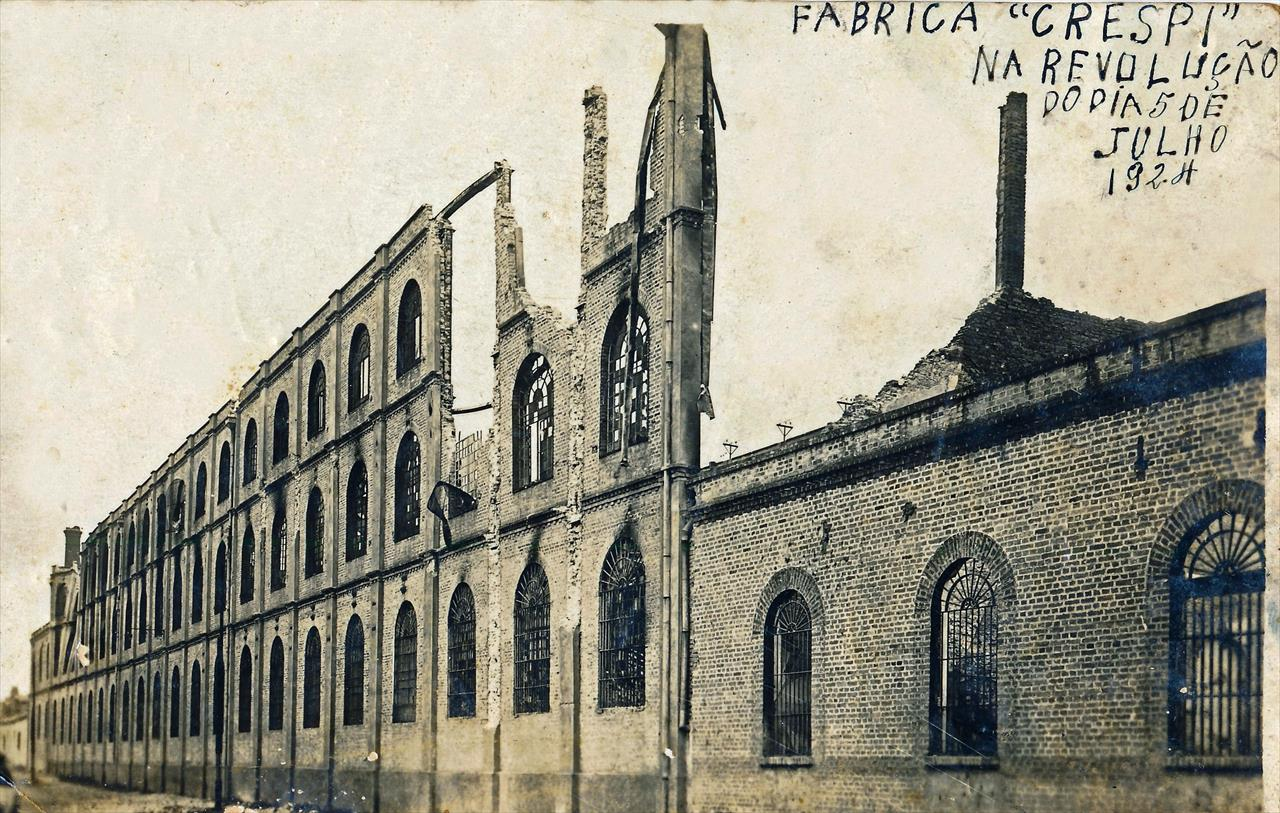
Wall of Cotonificio Crespi

Militarily, bombing may have been a way to progressively wear down the enemy and spare loyalist troops. However, it had little effect on the defenses; (Note: Santos 2013, p. 38. Some rebel fighters wrote of its ineffectiveness, such as Juarez Távora, quoted in Assunção 2014, p. 42, and corporal Antônio Bueno Salgado, quoted in Doria 2016, cap. 20.) Abílio de Noronha concluded it was an attack at random, without regulation and correction of fire, disobeying the principles of artillery. The Minister of War condemned his enemies for "fighting under the moral protection of the civilian population", but promised that he would not cause unnecessary material damage. Carlos de Campos was tougher in his rhetoric: "São Paulo would rather see its beautiful capital destroyed than legality in Brazil destroyed".

Historians discuss the bombing as deliberate violence against the civilian population, a "terror bombing" or "German-style bombing". This could be a way to pressure the rebels to leave the city, hastening a capitulation, a return to the brutal methods used in the Canudos and Contestado wars, and/or a punishment of the workers for their association with the rebels, or for the looting.

International law of the period condemned indiscriminate bombing, without regard for civilians, as a war crime. In the years after the revolt, the legality of the decision was hotly debated among jurists.

=== Population exodus ===
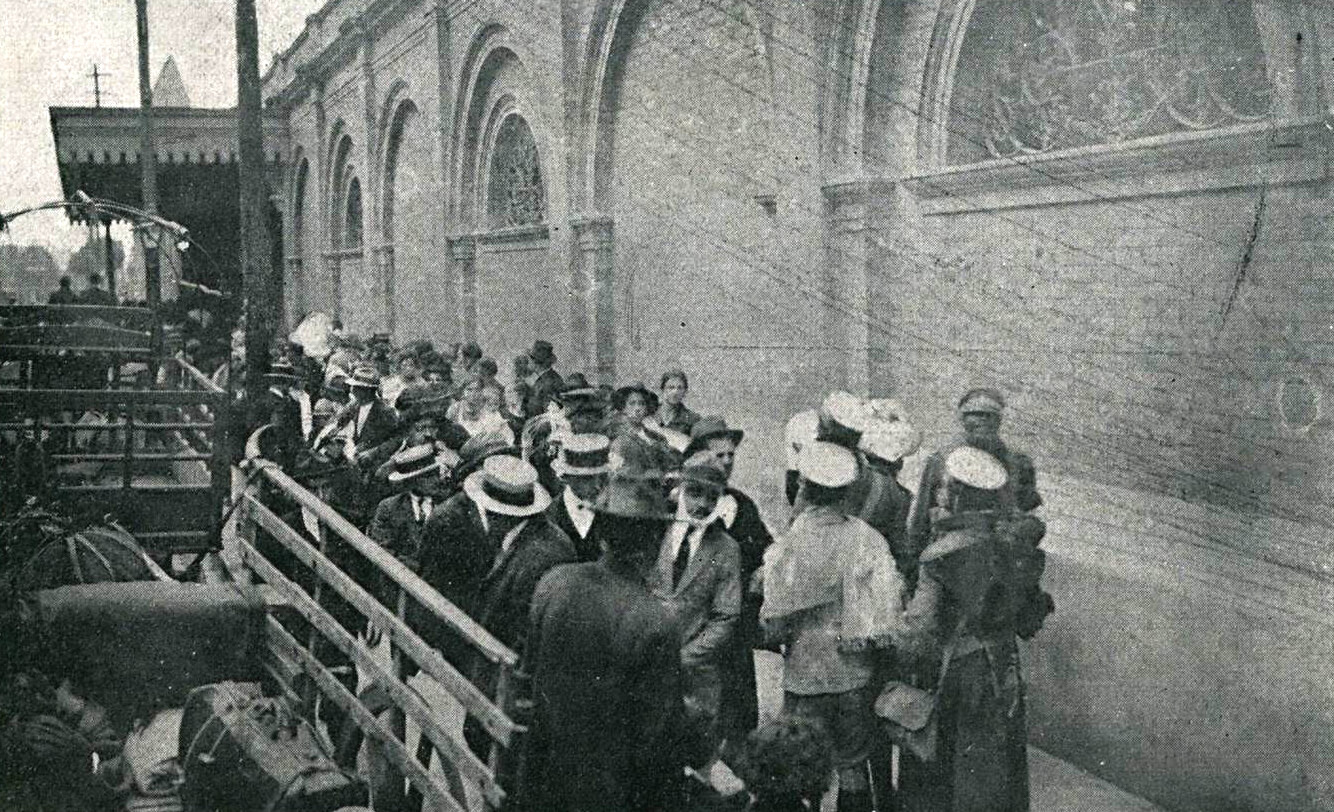
Return of refugees after the end of the conflict

Fleeing the violence, the population, especially in the most bombed regions, moved en masse to neighborhoods farther from the center, such as Casa Verde, Lapa, Perdizes and Santo Amaro, and to the interior of the state. The prefecture registered 42,315 people sheltering in hospitals, schools, churches and other institutions. Many other evacuees stayed in tarpaulin barracks.

257,981 refugees were counted by the prefecture, about a third of the city's 700,000 inhabitants; some figures go up to 300,000 refugees. Comparing the population of the municipality in the 2010s, with 11 million inhabitants, there would be 4 million refugees. (Note: "A number many times greater than the departure of São Paulo residents on holidays towards the coast and inland". Assunção Filho, Francisco Moacir (2015). São Paulo deve ser destruída. Rio de Janeiro: Record..) The main destination was Campinas, with smaller flows to Jundiaí, Itu, Rio Claro and even more distant municipalities such as Bauru. The rich preferred their farms or Santos. Cities such as Campinas began to have supply problems.

Refugees left by any means possible: in automobiles, carts, wagons or on foot. The main means of transport was the railroad, used by 212,385 refugees, according to the prefecture. Rail connections with the interior were re-established on 12 July, but they were irregular and risky. Families crowded into the Luz and Sorocabana stations, and the trains left with refugees hanging from the railings outside the wagons.

=== Relations with society ===
==== Economic elite ====
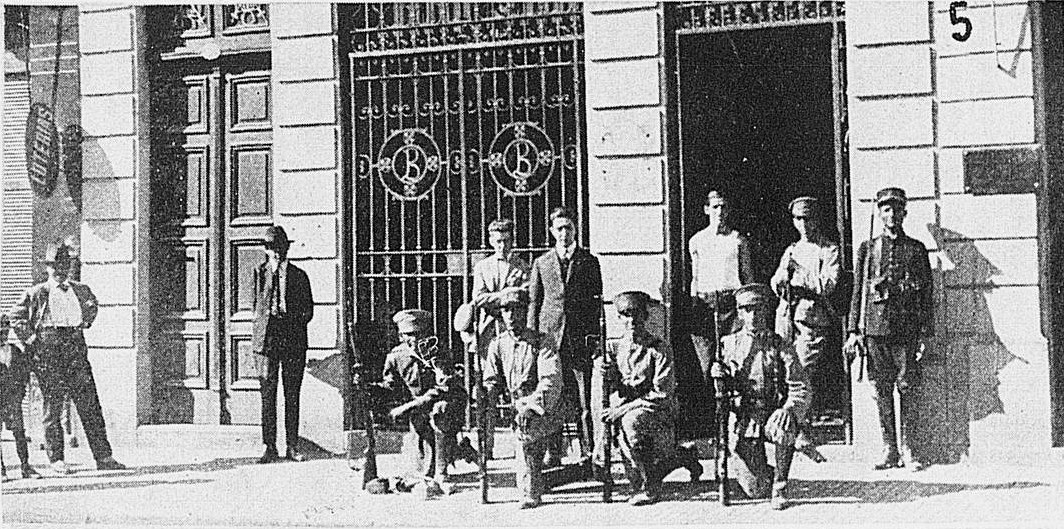
Rebel soldiers guarding a branch of the Bank of Brazil

The bombings, fires and looting caused plenty of losses to São Paulo's economic elite, who acted actively to defend their properties and prevent the collapse of the city. The rebels overthrew political power (i.e. the governor), but they still had to deal with economic power — the Industrial Center, Rural Society, Association of Banks and Commercial Association. The latter declared support for Carlos de Campos at the start of the revolt, but cooperated with the rebels when they became the real authority in the city.

The looting was a major factor in friction between the rebels and the bankers, farmers, industrialists, and merchants. Policing the streets with soldiers who could have been on the front lines was not in the interest of the rebels. On 10 July, general Isidoro attended a meeting of the Commercial Association, where it was decided that the City Hall would organize a Municipal Guard and a Supply Commission. The Guard was organized with 981 volunteers, among them more than a hundred students from the Faculty of Law of the University of São Paulo, the "Academic Brigade". These measures alleviated the problem of looting.

Formal power rested with the mayor, but the most important decisions came to be taken at Association meetings. Its president, José Carlos de Macedo Soares, developed a cordial relationship with general Isidoro and took on a leading role among "citizens in good standing". These were the notorious individuals whom the courts, in the trial following the revolt, recognized as having provided "services to the community, performing functions essential to the maintenance of order, in the absence of legally constituted authorities". Another important example in this group was Júlio de Mesquita. He was critical of the Republican Party of São Paulo, but his collaboration and that of other representatives of the elite, much criticized by more loyalist elements such as vice-mayor Luiz de Queirós, did not mean siding with the rebels.

On 11 July, the Board of the Association of Banks discussed an extension of the holidays with general Isidoro. There was no financial disconnection; financial operations were not under the control of the rebels, who allowed bankers to negotiate with the federal government. Industrialists and traders also wanted a moratorium, which would consist of extending the deadlines for paying off bank commitments, but this measure was only granted after the end of the conflict. The concern was the difficulty of paying wages to workers, which could result in disturbances. The scarcity of money was partly overcome by the circulation of bonds issued in the name of the revolution.

==== Workers ====
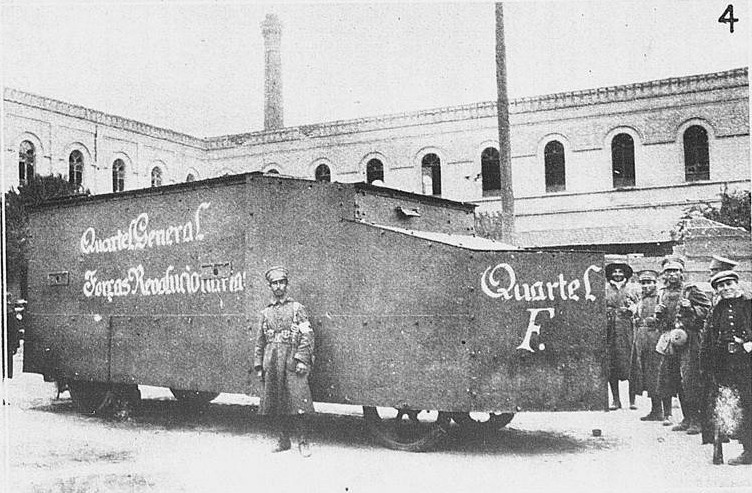
Armored car manufactured for the rebels

The participation of workers in the revolt, in different forms, was remarkable. At least 102 railroad workers collaborated with the rebels' logistics in the interior. In the railway workshops in São Paulo, other workers, directed by foreign technicians, improvised bombs, grenades, armored cars and even an armored train.

After 20 July, up to 750 immigrants enlisted in the revolutionary army, forming three foreign battalions (German, Hungarian, and Italian). The volunteers were mostly factory workers who had lost their wages due to the shutdown of factories. Some were World War I veterans with valuable experience for the war in São Paulo. Foreign "mercenaries" were one of the most controversial elements of the revolt; the loyalist press labeled them a threat to the Brazilian population and associated them with the immigrants' reputation in Brazil for political radicalism.

In general, workers joined in an improvised way, as simple residents and not as members of class organizations. Some rallies called by representatives of other classes attempted to mobilize this segment of the population, which, in turn, tried to include their agendas in the demands of the revolt. In organized civil society, the greatest support, even if only moral, came from guilds, unions, and associations dominated by anarchists and libertarian socialists in São Paulo and Rio de Janeiro. On 15 July, some of these militants pleaded for their sympathy in a "Motion by workers' militants to the Revolutionary Forces Committee", noting that the rebels' manifesto had given guarantees for the demands of the population. In Rio de Janeiro, the typography of Antônio Canellas, a former leader of the Brazilian Communist Party, published the pro-revolt newspaper O 5 de Julho.

==== Fears of revolution ====
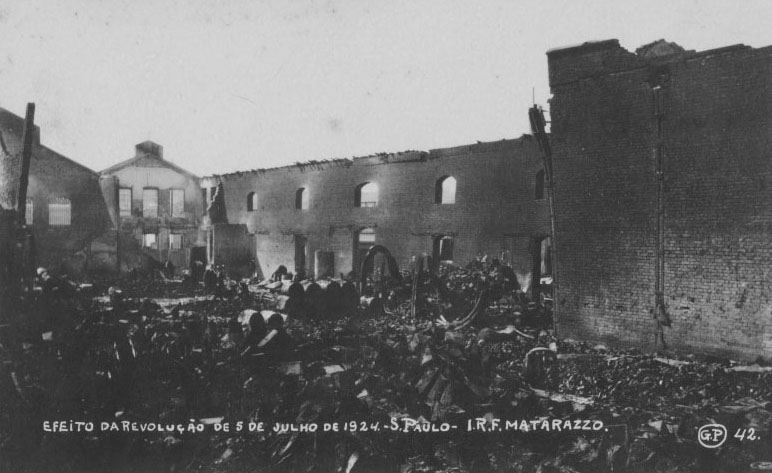
In a Matarazzo factory, the "annihilation of the industrial power of S. Paulo", foreshadowing a revolution, according to José Carlos de Macedo Soares

The war degraded workers' living conditions, and the tenentists' political program did not offer demands such as the minimum wage and the eight-hour workday. Anarchists admitted not having the revolution they dreamed of, but they saw revolutionary potential in the process. Their objective would be "a revolution as close to ours as possible", in the words of the newspaper A Plebe, which was optimistic over the looting and flight of the elite "in fear of a popular revenge". Orators encouraging looting, and volunteering in the revolutionary army, would also be indications of this potential. In 1925, the communists also considered the possibility of co-opting the tenentists' revolution, but during the revolt in São Paulo, they still opted for prudence, neither supporting nor criticizing the movement.

On the other side of the conflict, radicalization to the point of a revolution like the one that took place in Russia in 1917 was feared by the federal government, aware of the history of labor conflicts in São Paulo. Within the city, social unrest, not just immediate damage, was what motivated the Commercial Association to maintain order and minimize the damage of war. In the words of Macedo Soares, "the workers are already agitating and the Bolshevik aspirations are openly manifested. Later the unemployed will certainly attempt the subversion of social order".

For this reason, the Commercial Association and other representatives of the elite demanded that the federal government suspend the bombing, and at the same time, warded off the tenentist leadership from the workers' movements, warning about subversion and civil war. The tenentist leadership was divided: the involvement of wealthy civilians was welcome, while that of blue-collar workers was controversial. Isidoro was more conservative in this regard, and Miguel Costa was less so. As soldiers, the tenentists were part of an institution of state repression, and workers' involvement distorted what they understood as order. A more elitist tendency prevailed, and the movement paid more attention to merchants and political authorities than to workers' representatives.

In the desired "revolution with order", popular support could only come in favor of its political project in specific, or at least, without interfering in it. Therefore, recruiting foreign battalions was not a problem, but when the anarchists offered to form autonomous battalions, without military discipline and interference, they were refused by general Isidoro. According to tenente Nelson Tabajara de Oliveira, "this would distort the original motive of the movement"; "therefore, they were not interested in the presence of leftists in the fighting cadres, even if they came to reinforce the revolution". (Note: According to the police document "Denunciation of a subversive movement", from April 1924, the anarchist José Oiticica had agreed with the military conspirators to take action in Rio de Janeiro. The unrest of the working classes in the federal capital would distract the army garrison, and anarchists armed with hand grenades would assassinate Artur Bernardes in Petrópolis (Cunha 2011, p. 131-132).) Earlier, in planning the uprising, the Communists had offered to organize guerrilla warfare, and were similarly rebuffed. Later in 1924, the communist Octávio Brandão blamed this attitude for the defeat, classifying it as petty-bourgeois, positivist and narrow-minded.

==== Degree of popular support ====
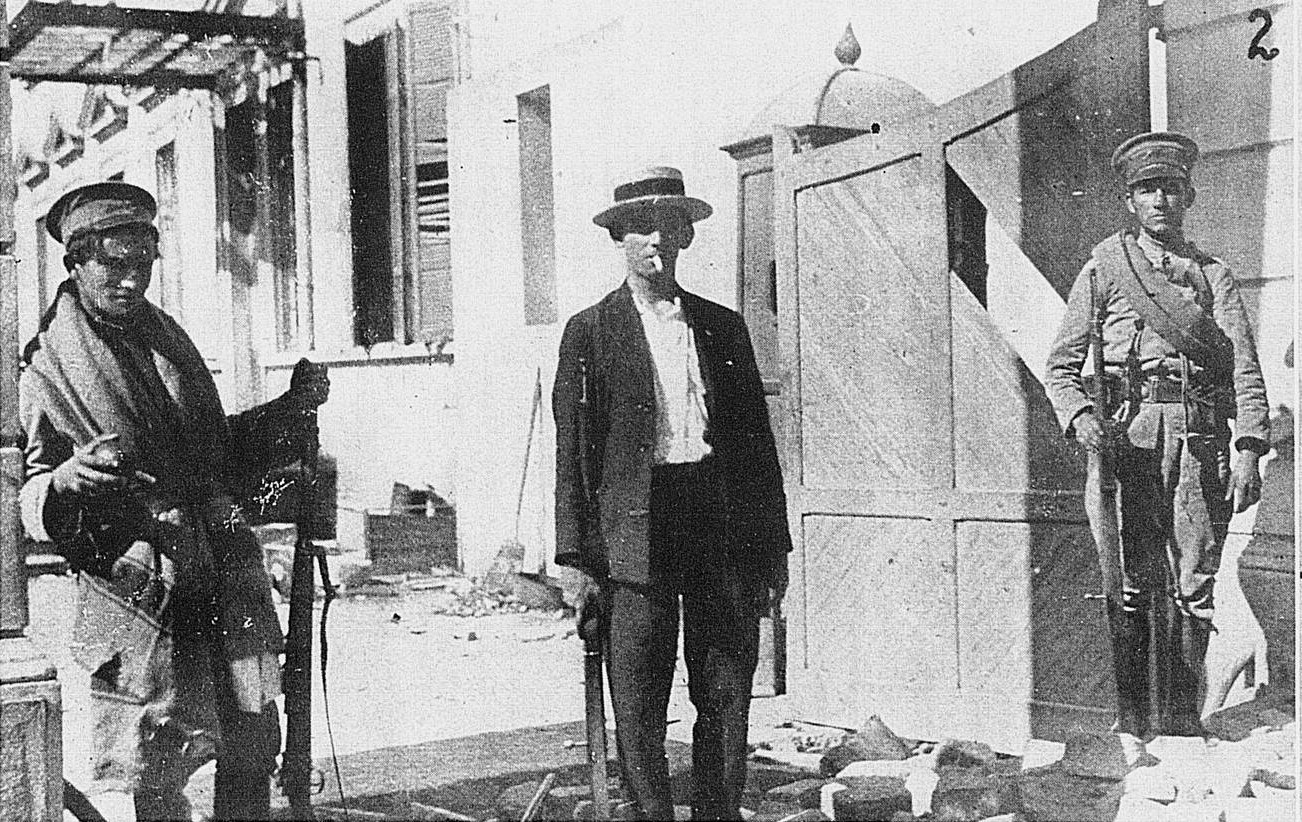
Off duty volunteer between two rebel soldiers

Plans for the revolt specified that "the people's material and, above all, moral support for the revolution is a very important factor for victory". Although tenentism is considered primarily a military movement, civilian involvement in the revolt was extensive. Civilians accounted for 61% of those indicted in court for participating in the movement, against 29% of military personnel from the army and 9% from the Public Force. Among them were many elements of the middle class, such as teachers, students, shopkeepers, and officials.

Aside from these active participants, observers' opinions varied widely, ranging from approval to outright condemnation. In the secondary literature, some sources present popular reaction as uncooperative or enthusiastic, with minimal support to the rebellion. Others describe popular support, and even an increasing mass participation. Reasons cited for the lack of support include the leadership's own lack of interest in negotiating with the proletariat, and the need to requisition food from the population. For the contrary thesis, the revolt attracted all sectors distressed by the political and economic situation, convincing by ideological affinities and the moralizing character of the movement. Loyalist bombing created antipathy to federal authorities.

Supporting evidence is found in the declarations to the courts after the revolt, and in several accounts of fraternization in the trenches. According to shoemaker Pedro Catalo, "in any house that these soldiers asked for food, coffee or other emergency favors, they were met with sympathy and enthusiasm". Isidoro was even praised in popular songs in viola caipira.

In July, Macedo Soares assessed that the population "bitterly compares the generous treatment it has received from the revolutionaries with the useless inhumanity of the uninterrupted bombing". Monteiro Lobato wrote in August that "the state of mind of the Brazilian people is one of open revolt", and the proof of this would be Carlos de Campos: "a government falls completely, destroyed in all its parts, and no one appears to defend it". In an open letter to the governor, he and other prominent paulistas, including figures from the PRP, warned that "loyalism does not exist in private", and civil servants, merchants, industrialists and academics sympathized with the revolution.

=== Humanitarian measures ===
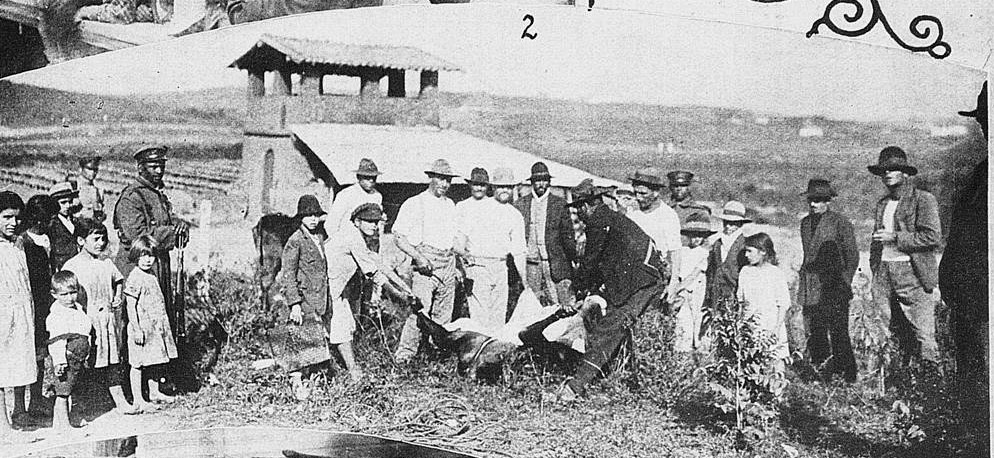
Cattle slaughter to feed government forces and the population

Public charity ensured the subsistence of part of the population. Even before the creation of the Public Supply Commission, the Red Cross, the Nationalist League and other institutions already provided services to the population. The City Commission checked food, fuel and firewood stocks, fixed prices and organized the transport of food and population to safer areas of the city. The prefecture identified 182 aid stations, where 581,187 meals were distributed. A representative traveled to Santos, but admiral Penido, who commanded the city, vetoed any food purchases.

While the fires raged, the Fire Department was inoperative, as its members fought in the loyalist army and, after the withdrawal of the state government, they left the city or remained as prisoners. At the request of Macedo Soares, general Isidoro released these prisoners, and the City Hall managed to reorganize the service on 25 July. Medical care took place at the Umberto Primo and Samaritano Hospitals, and Santa Casa de Misericórdia. The public cleaning sector buried or incinerated the dead animals, while the City Hall's Hygiene Department organized the burials. The bodies collected in the city were piled up at the Vila Mariana tram garage, where dozens of people inspected each corpse, looking for their missing family members. The number of bodies exceeded the gravediggers' working capacity and the supply of burial urns to the point that some were buried wrapped in sheets.

== The conflict broadens ==
=== Interior of São Paulo ===
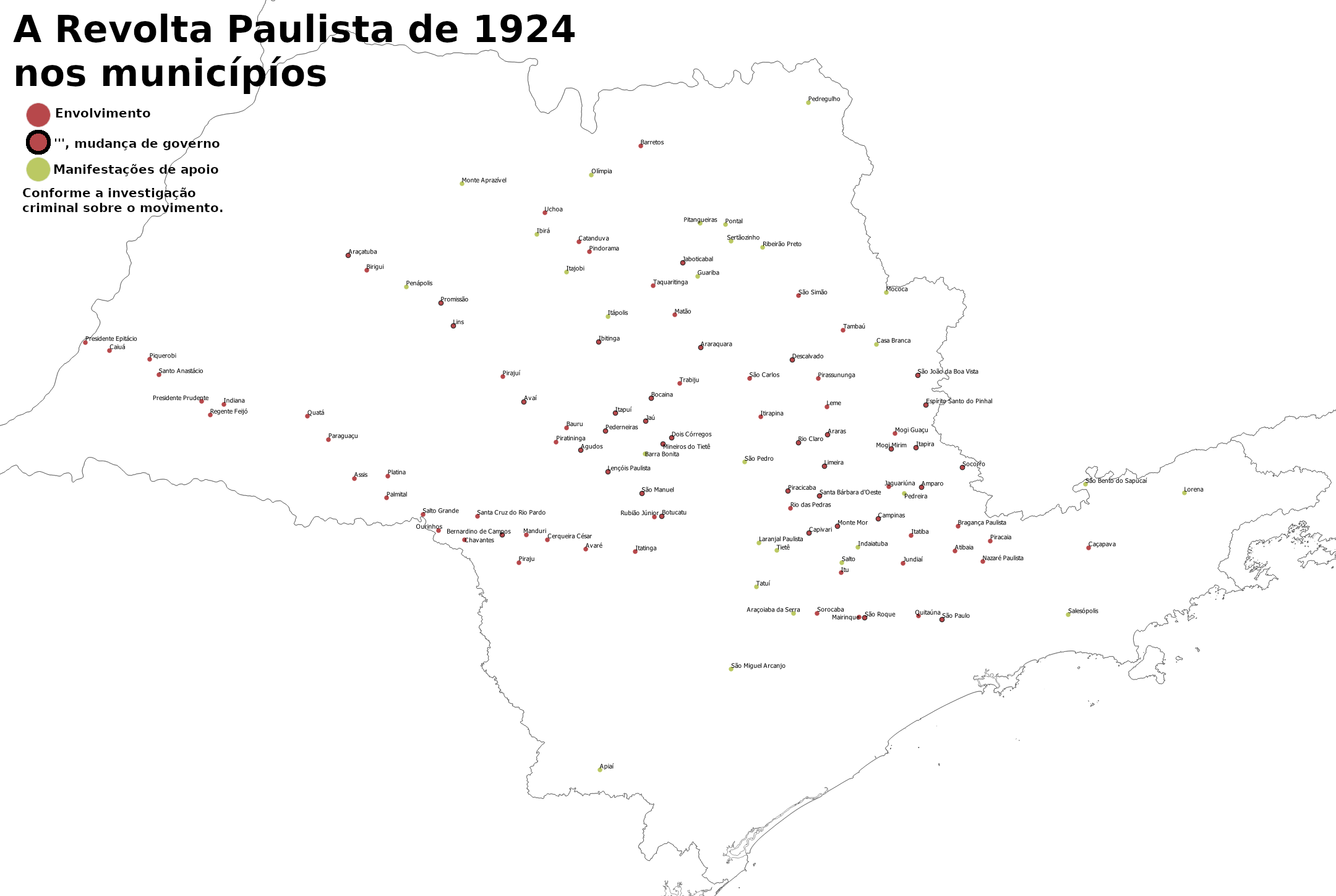
Municipalities of São Paulo with records of revolt or support for the revolt

87 municipalities in São Paulo had a record of revolt, and another 32 had demonstrations of support. Of the municipalities with revolt, in 21 it started with the initiative of civilians. Local political elites belonged to the Republican Party of São Paulo and tended to support the government, to the point of organizing patriotic battalions to fight the revolt. But the municipalities were very dependent on central power, which left them helpless. The opportunity was great for local dissidents. The mayors and police officers of 35 municipalities joined the revolt or were replaced by "governors" appointed by the rebels.

On 9 July, the rebels already controlled Itu, Jundiaí, Rio Claro and Campinas; the first three municipalities were dominated by local army units when they joined the revolt. By itself, Campinas already had great value as a railway junction and economic base. Alderman Álvaro Ribeiro, head of the municipal opposition, was appointed governor of the city and given authority to intervene in others.

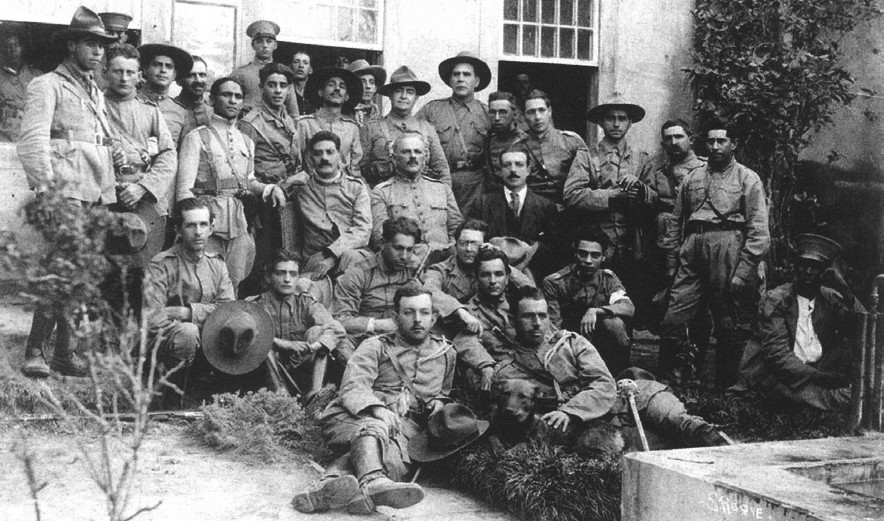
Júlio Prestes (in the middle, in a suit), one of the loyalists from the interior, among the officers of the patriotic battalions

Three loyalist brigades were sent to cut the rebels' rearguard: general Azevedo Costa came from Paraná, João Nepomuceno da Costa from Mato Grosso, and Martins Pereira from Minas Gerais. In response, on 17–19 July the revolutionary command sent three detachments to the Sorocabana, Mogiana, Paulista and Noroeste railways. At the end of the month, the rebels occupied the triangle between São Paulo, Campinas and Sorocaba, as well as a cone towards Bauru and Araraquara.

The most valuable objective was Bauru, an almost obligatory railway junction on the way to Mato Grosso, and where there was also strong local opposition. On 18 July, the city was occupied by captain Muniz Guimarães and his improvised column, made up of volunteers enlisted along the way. There were no exhausting fights. 300 soldiers from the Public Force could have defended the city, but they had been sent away amid panic and rumors about Carlos de Campos leaving the center of the capital. The Mato Grosso brigade, which could also have defended Bauru, would only arrive the following month, delayed by the precariousness of mobilization and the revolutionary sympathies of its officers.

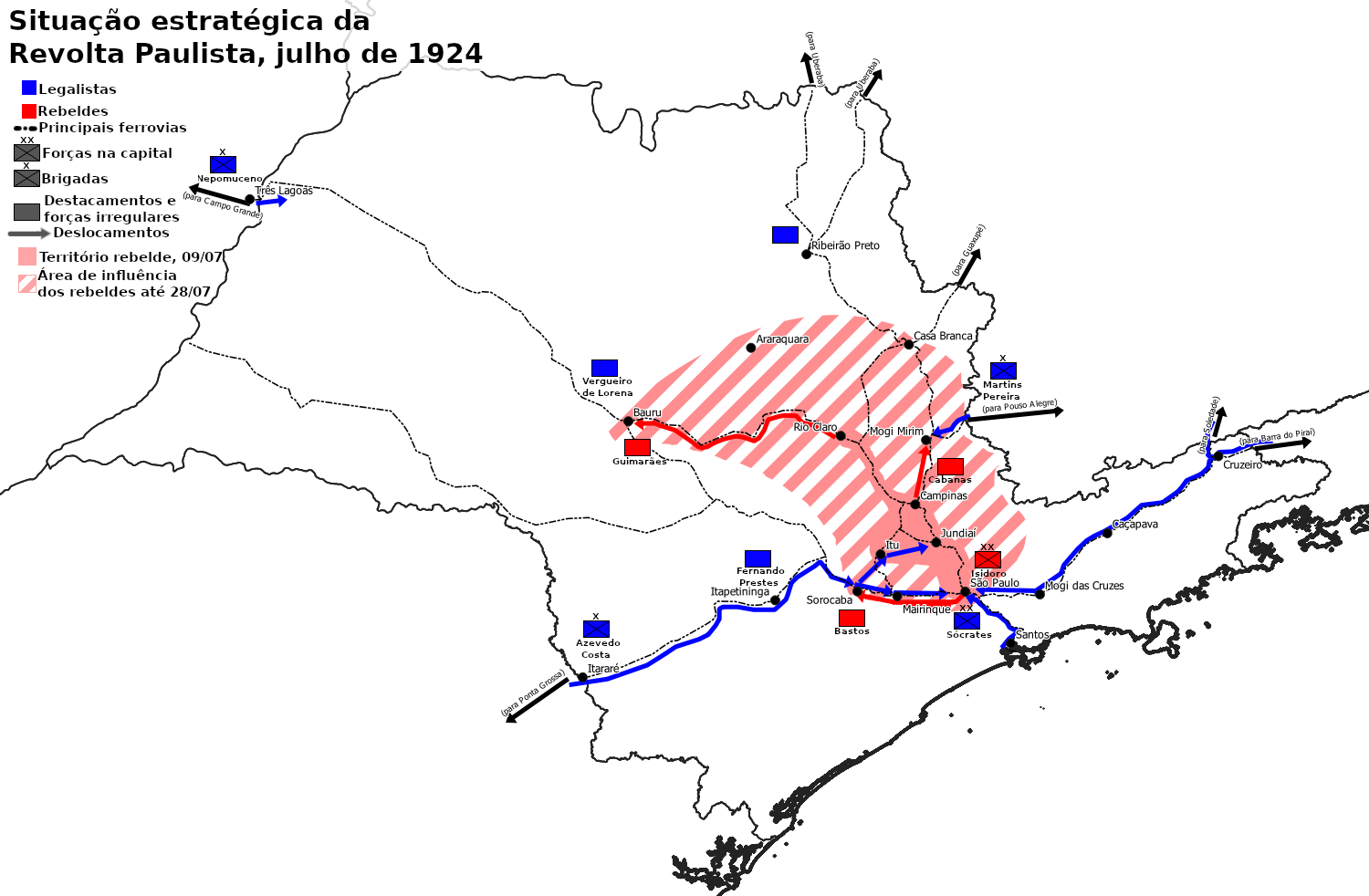
Inland railway control

At Mogiana, lieutenant João Cabanas led an initial force of 95 men against general Martins Pereira's nearly 800 regulars. But the loyalists spread their forces too thinly and acted passively, while Cabanas had an experienced troop, which he kept concentrated and constantly on the move, using psychological warfare to mislead the opponent as to their direction and manpower. His contingent, which was nicknamed the "Death Column", was victorious in Mogi Mirim, on the 23rd, and Espírito Santo do Pinhal, on the 26th, frustrating Martins Pereira's intention to advance against Campinas.

Only in Sorocabana were the loyalists victorious. Captain Francisco Bastos left the rebels in a positional defense, giving the loyalists plenty of time to organize. General Azevedo Costa was reinforced at Itapetininga by three patriotic battalions organized by Fernando Prestes. On 19 July, he organized the Southern Operations Column or Southern Column, with which he sent a vanguard to Itu and another to São Paulo. En route to São Paulo, the second vanguard defeated strong resistance at Pantojo and Mairinque on 26–27 July.

=== Parallel uprisings ===
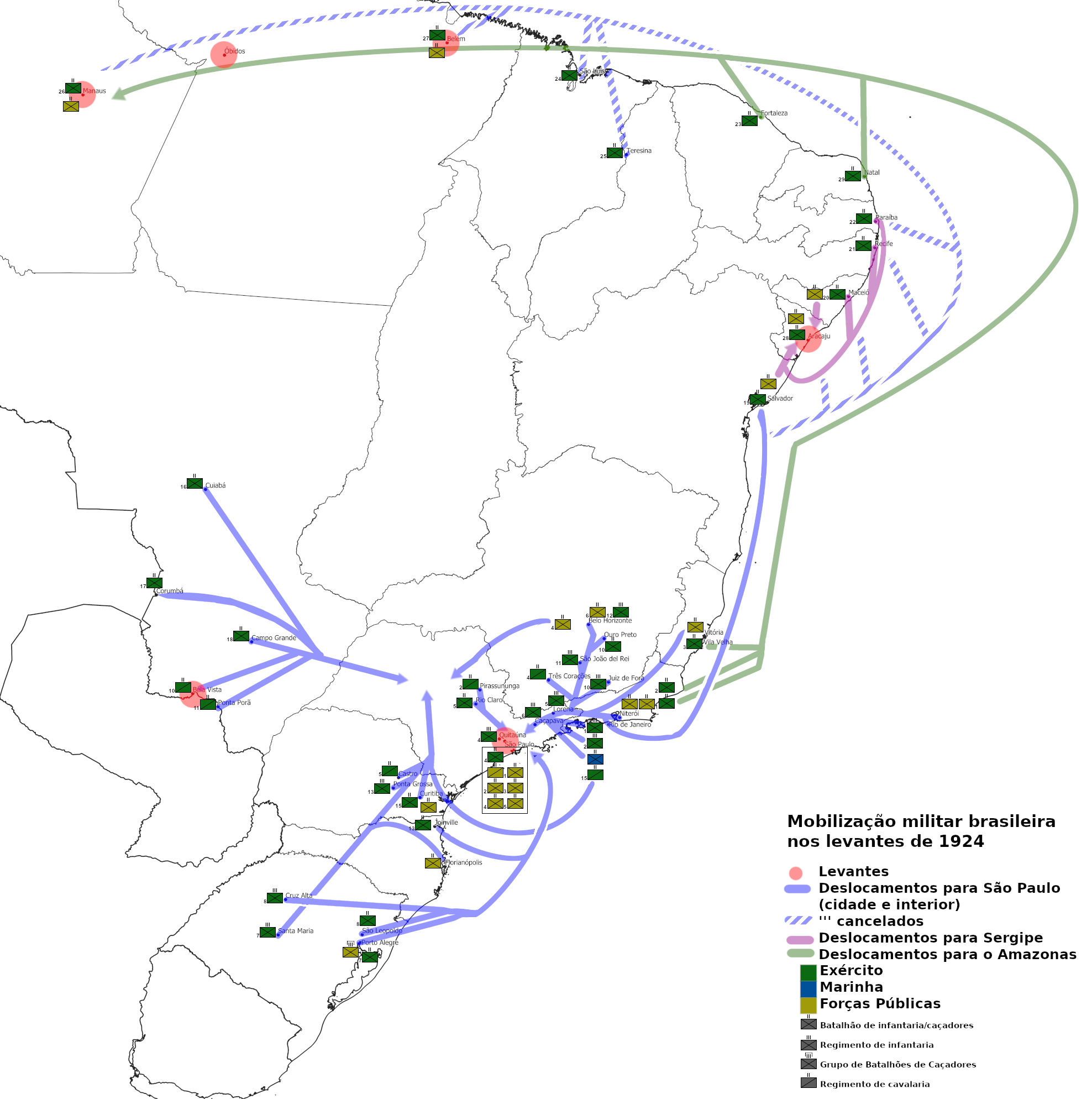
The national dimension of the 1924 uprisings and the mobilization of federal and state troops

The São Paulo revolt was the propagating focus of a series of tenentist uprisings in other regions of Brazil, collectively referred to as the "1924 uprisings" (Note: For example, Barros 2005, p. 27, Souza 2018, p. 227. CPDOC divides its material into the topics "The 20s - Political Crisis", "Lieutenant Movement", "18 of the Fort", "1924 Uprisings" and "Prestes Column".) or "1924 revolts". Each had its own particularities. These were not, however, the support expected by the São Paulo conspirators, but few, dispersed and unsuccessful outbreaks of rebellion.

The parallel uprisings were a way to divert government reinforcements on their way to São Paulo, relieving pressure on the São Paulo rebels. Several battalions of caçadores from the current North and Northeast regions received orders to embark for Rio de Janeiro, but only the 19th, from Salvador, got to fight in São Paulo. (Note: This battalion departed on 10 July (Maynard 2008, p. 58), and is the only one of the northerners and northeasterners in the loyalist order of battle in São Paulo, registered in Costa & Góis 1924, p. 119-130.) The 20th, 21st, 22nd and 28th, respectively from Maceió, Recife, Paraíba (now João Pessoa) and Aracaju, were preparing to embark when the 28th rebelled on 13 July, and the others were redirected to fight it in Sergipe. On the same day, boarding orders for the 24th, 25th and 26th, respectively from São Luís, Teresina and Belém, were cancelled. New arrangements were made with the 26th and 27th, from Manaus, but these also rebelled, respectively, on the 26th and 23rd of July.

An uprising in Pará quickly failed in combat with the State Military Brigade. The Sergipe and Amazonas uprisings went further than the São Paulo one, installing new state governments. Both movements were defeated in August, after the loyalist victory in the city of São Paulo. In the case of Amazonas, the federal government had to send 2,700 soldiers to the North, from battalions in the Northeast, Espírito Santo and Rio de Janeiro. (Note: Jornal do Commercio reported the landing in Manaus of contingents of the 1st, 2nd, 3rd, 21st, 23rd and 29th Battalions of Caçadores. The 1st and 2nd were from Rio de Janeiro, the 3rd from Espírito Santo, the 21st from Pernambuco, the 23rd from Ceará and the 29th from Rio Grande do Norte (Savian 2023, pp. 337–342). The 3rd had been in Rio de Janeiro since 7 July, before the outbreak of the uprising in the North, see História do Exército em Vila Velha and the battalion history.) In addition to dealing with two war fronts, in the Amazon and in the South-Southeast, the government, as a precaution, had to maintain defense forces in Rio de Janeiro, where the navy was anchored and the army's personnel were concentrated.

Only in Mato Grosso did the plans of the conspiracy in São Paulo have a concrete result. The commander of the 1st Mixed Brigade himself, lieutenant colonel Ciro Daltro, may have delayed the movement to São Paulo to benefit the rebels. On 12 July, the 10th Independent Cavalry Regiment, in Bela Vista, revolted, but it was contained by the unit's sergeants.

== Loyalist victory in the capital ==
The fighting in the city of São Paulo lasted until the night of 27 July, when the rebels withdrew by train towards the interior. In Isidoro's assessment, it would still have been possible to resist for another ten or fifteen days inside the city.

=== Final combats ===
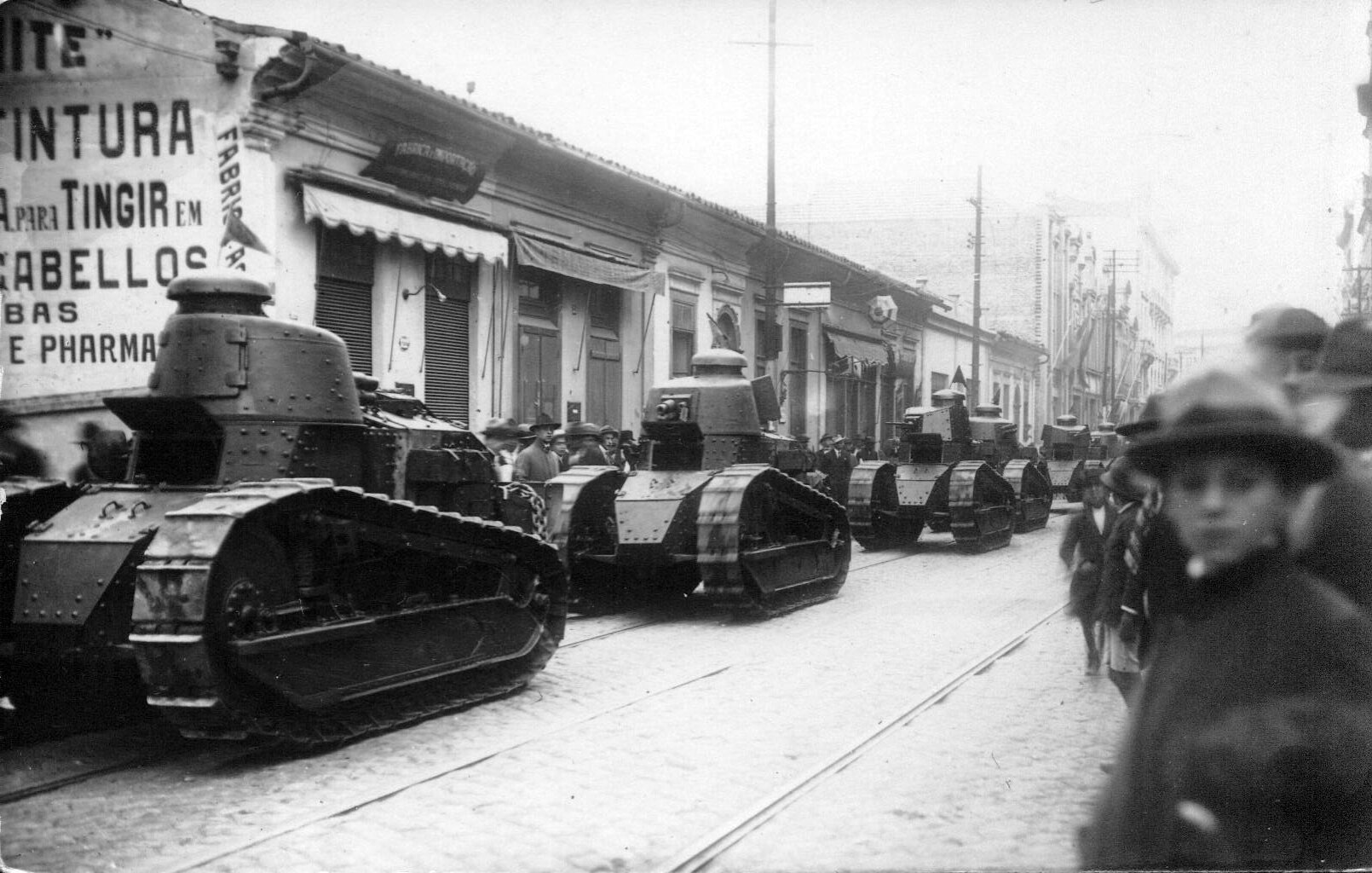
Assault Car Company parade

Each side resorted to novelties in military technology. Loyalist Military Aviation began flying over the city on 19 July. It operated little, but its bombings had a psychological impact. Naval Aviation stayed with the fleet in Santos. The rebels used requisitioned civilian planes, but only for reconnaissance and propaganda distribution.

The Assault Car Company, with eleven Renault FT-17s, attacked the rebels in Belenzinho from the 23 July; there are reports of initial success, later mitigated by the lack of infantry support for these tanks. Brazil's first attempt to build armor took place in workshops in rebel territory, but the resulting two cars were too heavy to move. There was more success with an armored train, used in raids on loyalist positions in Central do Brasil until 26 July, when it was derailed by an artillery ambush. On the São Paulo Railway, the Navy improvised railway artillery with cannons from the ships.

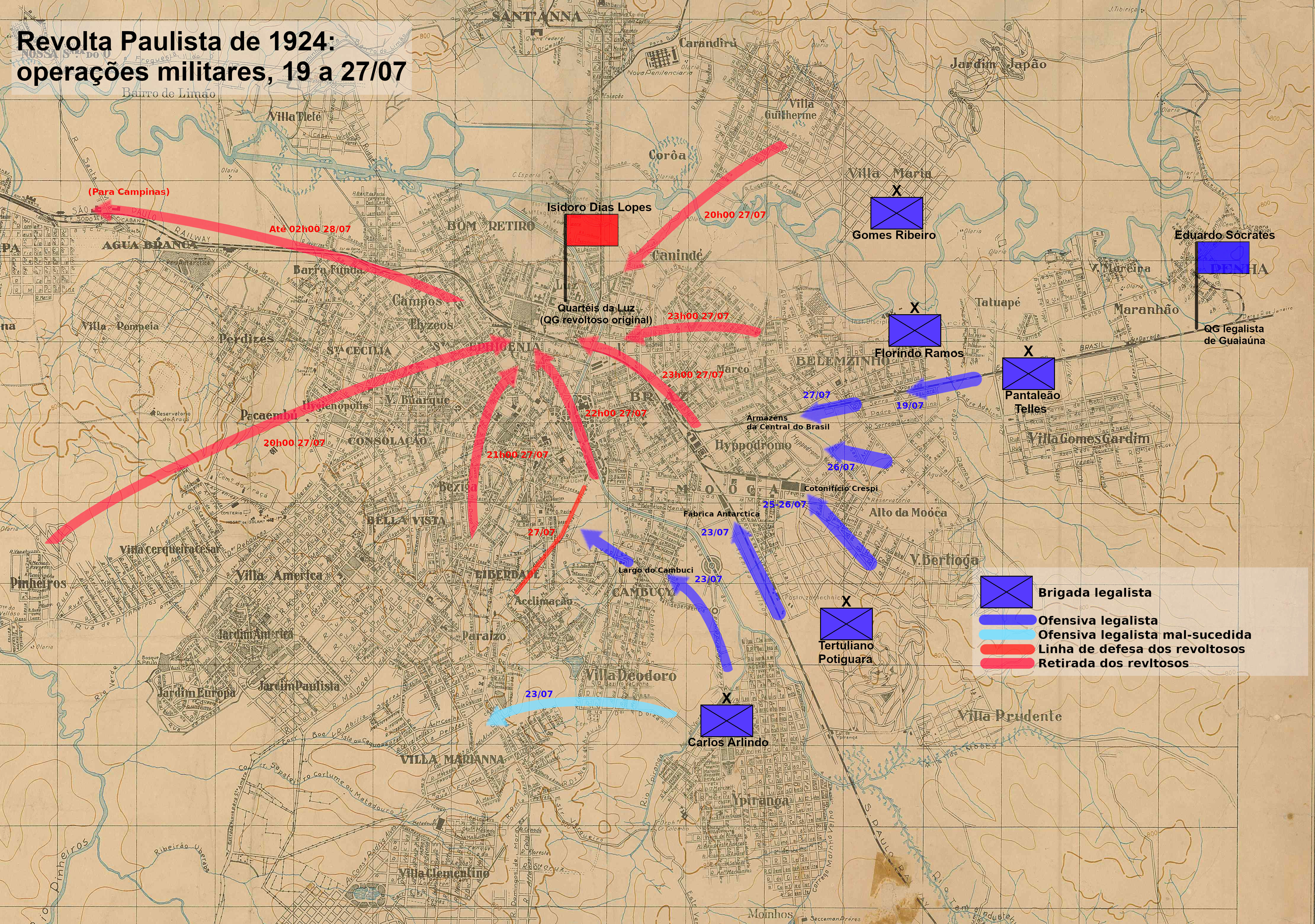
Loyalist offensives until the rebels' withdraw

On 23 July, after days of intense combat, loyalists captured two strongholds, Largo do Cambuci and the Antarctica Factory, in Mooca; on the other hand, their offensive at Vila Mariana was defeated. The broad loyalist offensive resumed on 25 July, when the Military Brigade of Rio Grande do Sul approached another redoubt, Cotonifício Crespi. The following day, the Public Force of Minas Gerais dominated the Hipódromo da Mooca, and on the next the Central do Brasil warehouse, already preparing to occupy the North Station. In Brás, Cambuci and Liberdade, defensive sectors retreated.

On 26 July, loyalist planes distributed bulletins from the Ministry of War over the city urging the population to leave the city as "to spare themselves the effects of military operations, which, in a few days, will be carried out". The mood of panic increased; in the interpretation of Macedo Soares, that was "the threat of a general bombardment, of complete destruction of the city, indistinct, without respite, over the built area". Even worse, for him, the 400,000 inhabitants left in the city had no way to get out.

=== Negotiation attempts ===
Since the start of the loyalist bombing, welfare institutions, representatives of merchants and industrialists, and foreign diplomats had tried to negotiate a ceasefire. This intervention had humanitarian motives and, equally, interests at stake. On 12 July, Macedo Soares, Júlio Mesquita, Dom Duarte Leopoldo e Silva, the Archbishop of São Paulo, and Vergueiro Steidel, president of the Nationalist League, sent the following telegram to the President of Brazil:

We ask Your Excellency for charitable intervention to stop the bombardment against the defenseless city of S. Paulo, since the revolutionary forces agreed not to use their cannons to the detriment of the city. The commission does not have any political intention but exclusively compassion for the population of São Paulo.

Minister of War Setembrino de Carvalho replied that the moral damage caused by the revolt was much worse than the material damage to the city. He proposed that the rebels spare the population, leaving the city to fight in the open. Another response came from general Sócrates, when asked by the consuls of Portugal, Italy, and Spain: he would spare the civilian areas, as long as the rebels indicated where their troops were.

On 16 July, Macedo Soares communicated with general Noronha, a prisoner of the rebels, asking him to intercede with the president. The general agreed to be a go-between for an armistice and the next day he read Isidoro's demands. The first: "immediate handover of the Federal Government to a provisional government composed of national names of recognized probity and confidence of the revolutionaries. Example: Dr. Venceslau Brás". Noronha dismissed it completely; the resignation of Artur Bernardes, under these conditions, would be for him a "blow to national sovereignty by the edge of bayonets".

In a new proposal on 27 July, the rebels, already on the verge of defeat, had a single demand, amnesty for the rebels of 1922 and 1924. Macedo Soares wrote a letter to general Sócrates, arguing that "the victory of any of the fighting parties, if it is not immediate, will no longer save the State of S. Paulo and, therefore, Brazil, from the most desolate ruin". For him, the danger of social unrest was more serious than military rebellion, and so he requested a 48-hour armistice so that Abílio de Noronha could negotiate. Journalist Paulo Duarte delivered the letter in Guaiaúna, where it was read by Carlos de Campos. The governor, irritated, accused the negotiators of making common cause with the rebels and promised to increase the bombings.

=== Rebels withdraw from the city ===
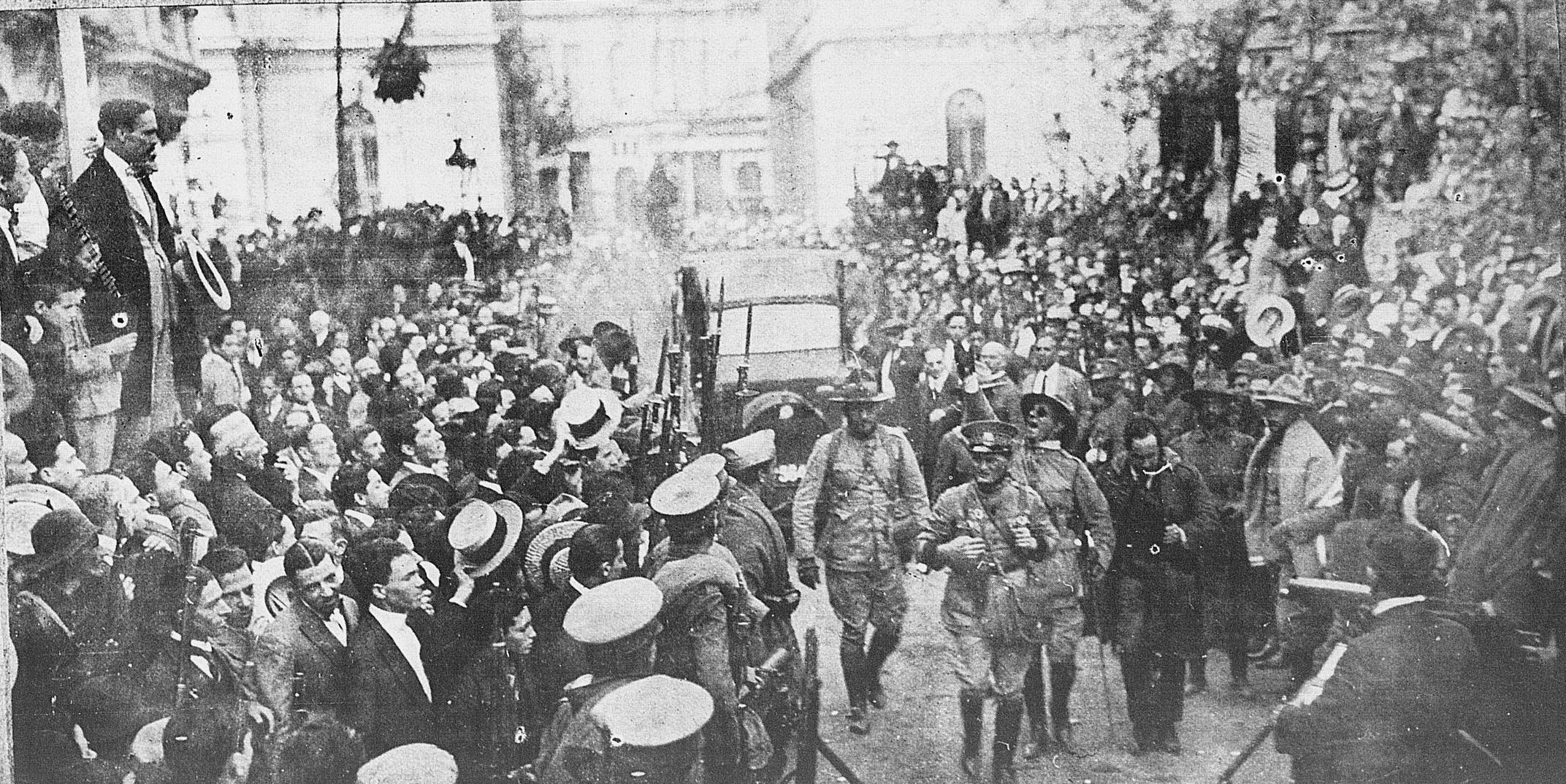
General Potiguara arriving at the Government Palace

On 27 July, the revolutionary high command took an unforeseen decision, but which seemed to be the only way to prolong the movement: withdraw the army from São Paulo, waging a war of movement in the interior. The only road to Campinas was about to be cut, trapping them in the capital, where further combat would only result in the destruction of the rebels themselves and the population. Negotiations failed, and the only possibility of victory would be with new uprisings in Rio de Janeiro and Minas Gerais. The fighters were worn out, many of them wounded; there are conflicting reports about troop morale. (Note: According to Miguel Costa, it was still good (Savian 2023, p. 113); Santos 2013, p. 73 has the same judgment. Carneiro 1965, p. 276, reports that "the incorporation of volunteers and mercenaries were not enough to cover the desertions and the abandonment of the trenches by the 'braves' who preferred prostitutes and entertainment at the rearguard".)

Pressure from the loyalist division was supposed to pin the rebels in combat, preventing a retreat, which is a laborious and risky military operation. Ordnance was loaded on trains starting at 14:00, but the troops withdrew at night, and loyalists had no night patrols or contact with enemy infantry. The revolutionary army escaped largely intact, with all its supplies; only a few elements of the southern detachment were left behind. The loyalists did not realize the withdrawal until the morning of 28 July. In Jundiaí, the South Column cut the road to Campinas at noon, but at 07:00 the last train had passed through Itirapina. A day's difference would have prevented the escape. The fleeing rebels headed towards Mato Grosso, where they hoped to strengthen the movement with local sympathizers, descend to Paraná, or, in the worst case scenario, go into exile in Paraguay or Bolivia. It was the only viable direction: Minas Gerais was opposed to revolutionary ideas, and the loyalists dominated southern São Paulo.

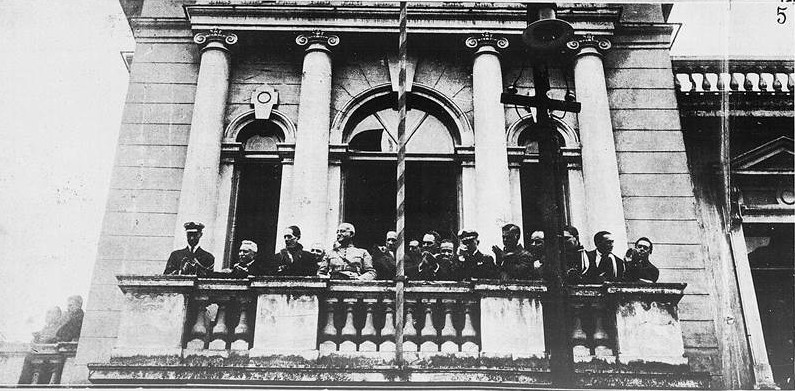
Eduardo Sócrates, Carlos de Campos and other authorities on the balcony of the Campos Elíseos Palace

At 10:00 on the 28th, Carlos de Campos reopened his office at the Campos Elíseos Palace. The city's deoccupation celebrated with fanfare and military parades through the central streets. According to Macedo Soares, the population received them coldly; Monteiro Lobato compared the loyalist parades with the "German army entering Paris". Several newspapers criticized the behavior of loyalist soldiers during the reoccupation, and the anarchist press denounced the occurrence of rapes. There are reports of looting of commercial stores by soldiers from the Public Forces of Rio de Janeiro and Minas Gerais. Due to these accusations, the Public Force of Minas Gerais expelled 17 soldiers, but incorporated them again when an investigation concluded that they were innocent or inculpable.

By the beginning of August, industries and services were back in business, numerous workers were clearing the rubble and the damaged buildings were being rebuilt. Scouts looked for corpses buried in backyards, squares and gardens, and families from the countryside, out of curiosity, visited the abandoned trenches.

== Continuation of the revolt ==
The rebels of 1924 went much further than those of 1922, and the movements started in 1924 dragged on until 1927, as part of the Miguel Costa-Prestes Column. The flight to the interior distanced the tenentists from Rio de Janeiro, whom they never managed to threaten..

=== From São Paulo to the Paraná River ===
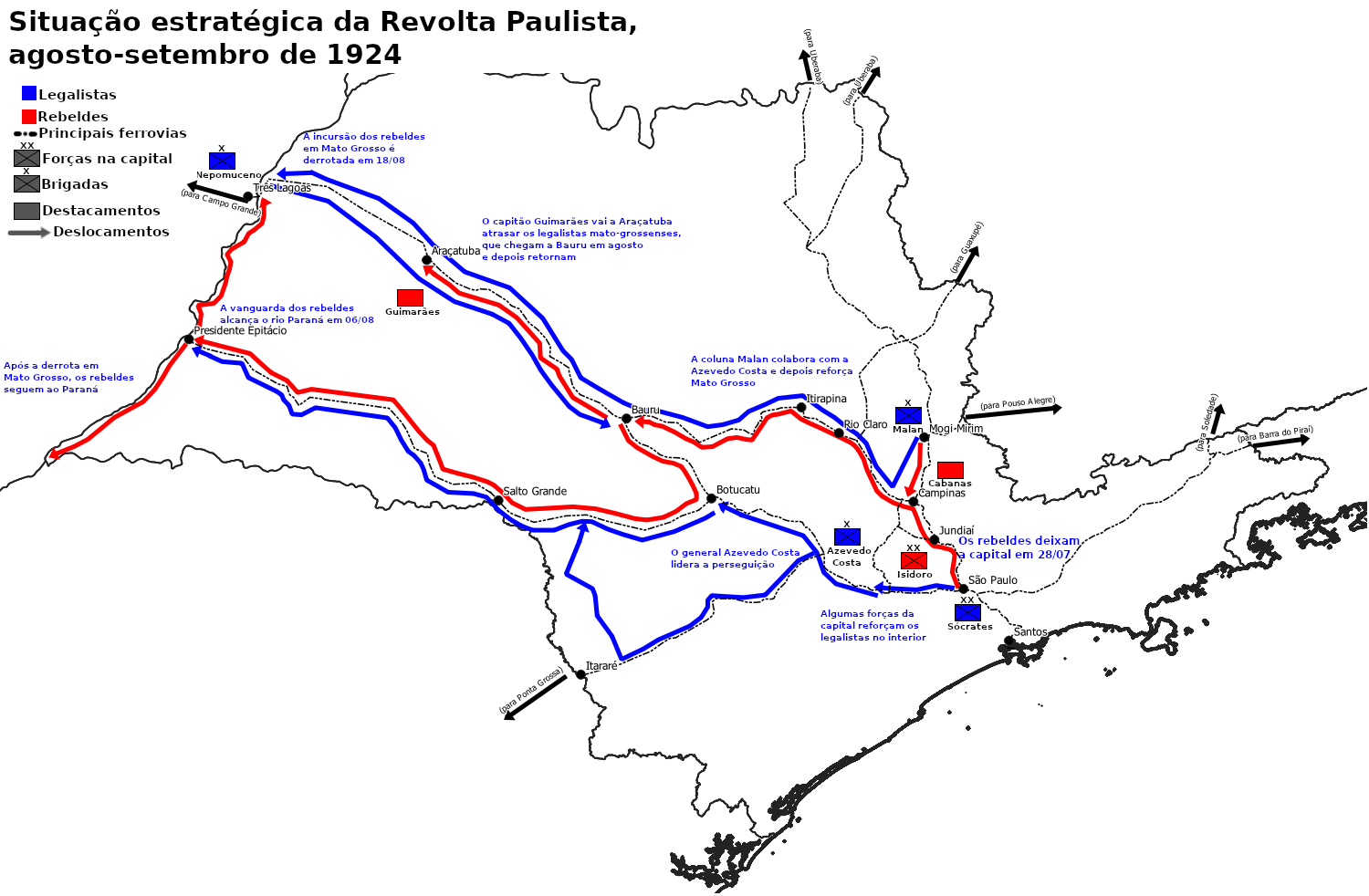
Map of the rebels' retrat

The revolutionary army arrived in Bauru on 28 July, where it was reorganized into three brigades commanded by Bernardo de Araújo Padilha, Olinto Mesquita de Vasconcelos and Miguel Costa. The Noroeste Railroad's passage to Mato Grosso, in Três Lagoas, was already blocked by the loyalists. The only option was the Sorocabana branch, through Botucatu to Presidente Epitácio. A detachment was sent to Araçatuba, in the Northwest, to delay the Mato Grosso brigade. Three days of rearguard fighting in Botucatu and São Manuel ensured the evacuation of the bulk of the revolutionary army.

The rebel vanguard stopped in Assis on 5 August, when a ceremony celebrated one month of the revolt and the newspaper O Libertador was published. The following day it occupied Porto Tibiriçá, in Presidente Epitácio, on the banks of the Paraná River. The rearguard operations would still take 42 days along the 1,200 kilometers of road, where several battles against the loyalist pursuit columns were fought, notably in Santo Anastácio. This mission fell to the "Death Column", which systematically destroyed the railway infrastructure along the way to delay the loyalist advance. This was a military necessity, but it created controversy in the press. João Cabanas became both famous and infamous, accused of numerous acts of vandalism, threats, and murders during the police investigation into the movement. In his writings, Cabanas boasted of the terror his name instilled in his opponents, but claimed to have severely punished criminality among the soldiers, even resorting to executions.

On the banks of the Paraná river, the revolutionary command was divided over strategy: colonel João Francisco wanted to go downstream and, in western Paraná, connect with officers committed to the movement in Rio Grande do Sul. Isidoro preferred to go up to Três Lagoas and invade Mato Grosso. A "Free State of Brasilândia" would be established, financed by tariffs on the export of yerba mate. Easily defended by the Paraná River, the rebels would have time to rebuild their forces and reconquer São Paulo, or at least force the government to negotiate.

From 8 to 18 August, successive expeditions went up the river to occupy Três Lagoas, on the Mato Grosso side. The city was better defended than they expected: the Mato Grosso loyalists had withdrawn the troops sent to Bauru to defend their own territory, and were reinforced by Colonel Malan d'Angrogne and his column from Minas Gerais. The last expedition, led by Juarez Távora, was defeated south of Três Lagoas, in what has been called the bloodiest battle of the São Paulo Revolt. The only good news was that the loyalists had concentrated too many forces to the north, and the way to Paraná was open.

=== Link with the Rio Grande do Sul rebels ===
The rebel vanguard entered Paraná's territory in the town of São José, on 31 August. When the loyalists reoccupied Porto Tibiriçá, on 10 September, all the rebels had already embarked and gone down the river. This region was sparsely populated and little connected, to the point that the government did not initially know where rebels were. The crossing was slow; in September the vanguard reached Foz do Iguaçu, while the rearguard was still between the Mato Grosso and São Paulo banks. João Cabanas described the state of morale after leaving Porto Tibiriçá:

I had the intuition that we had reached the beginning of failure, and that we were going to enter the guerrilla regime, the last resort of revolutions that did not win in their first impetus. In fact, we could hold the banner of the revolution high in the bosom of that exuberant nature for months. But later on, tiredness and a cooling of enthusiasm would appear, due to the monotony of the days that followed. A hope still gleamed in the midst of these painful considerations, strengthening morale: the fulfillment of the promises of the uprising of military garrisons from various states.

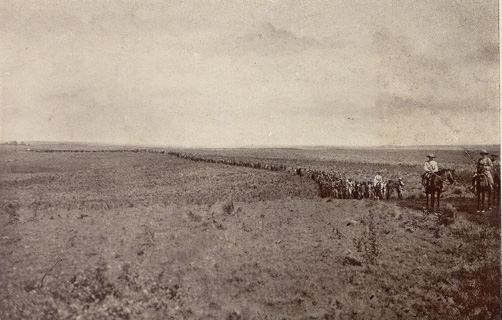
Surrender of remnants of the São Paulo revolt in Catanduvas, Paraná

New revolts broke out in October and November in the battleship São Paulo and in the garrisons of Rio Grande do Sul, both of which were defeated. The remnants of the Rio Grande do Sul revolt, led by Luís Carlos Prestes, began a journey north to reach the rebel territory in Paraná, between the Paraná, Piquiri and Iguaçu rivers. The Paraná campaign turned into trench warfare in the Catanduvas region, marked by logistical and movement difficulties and diseases that killed far more than combat wounds. Without reinforcements and any regular resupply, the rebels were exhausted by general Cândido Rondon's more numerous troops.

At the end of March 1925, the last defenders of Catanduvas surrendered to the loyalist offensive. The remaining São Paulo rebels retreated towards the Paraná River and joined their comrades from Rio Grande do Sul who finally arrived in Paraná. The 1st Revolutionary Division, formed at this junction, became known as the "Miguel Costa-Prestes Column". General Isidoro went into exile, due to his old age, while the division escaped the siege by entering Paraguayan territory and returning to Brazil through Mato Grosso. This column prolonged the revolt until 1927, marching through 36,000 kilometers of Brazil's territory.

== Consequences ==
=== Human losses ===
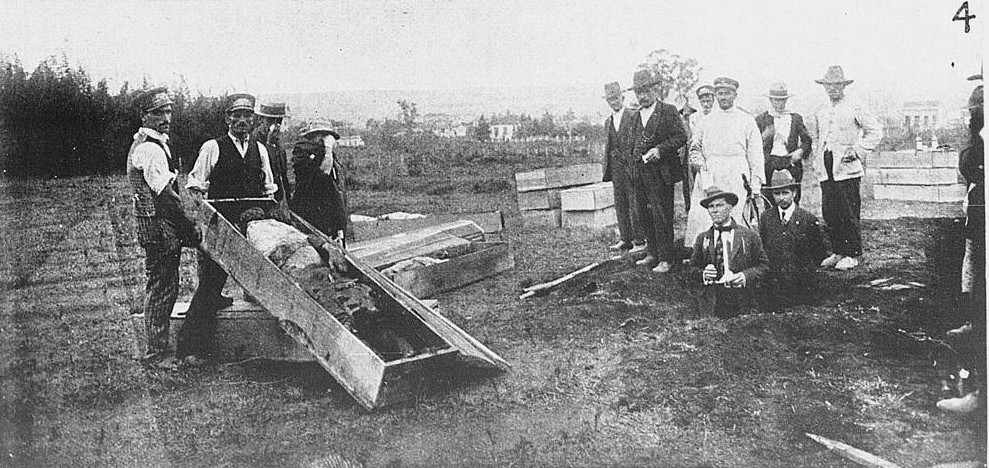
Exhumation of corpses to take them to the cemetery

Due to the number of deaths, the conflict has already been called the "greatest urban massacre carried out during republican governments". The city government's report counted 503 dead and 4,846 injured in the conflict. These numbers are still contested today; some sources point to 800 dead and 5,000 wounded. International agencies estimated 1,000 dead. According to Santa Casa records, 723 civilians were killed; the conflict reportedly averaged 30 dead and 100 wounded per day. The prefectural count does not include casualties outside the city, and likely omitted large numbers of corpses buried outside cemeteries. On 29 July, one newspaper reported hundreds of dead bodies found on plots across Belenzinho and Mooca, and in August, another mentioned 500 bodies on the outskirts of the city. Artur Bernardes is accused of having ordered the counting to be suspended.

Loyalists are accused of summary shootings and mass graves. Abílio de Noronha mentioned these accusations against one of the brigadier generals, but defended general Sócrates, saying that, if they occurred, they did not have his approval. A well-known case is the execution of three civilians accused of espionage by the Public Force of Minas Gerais; their families were taking refuge under the stands of the Hipódromo da Mooca.

The Public Force of Minas Gerais registered six dead and seven wounded in the fighting in the capital, two dead and five wounded in Espírito Santo do Pinhal, and three dead and seven wounded in Três Lagoas. Prior to 10 July, the Navy had 83 killed, wounded, and lost. The Military Brigade of Rio Grande do Sul accounted for 26 dead and 30 wounded in all its operations in the state of São Paulo.

=== Material damage ===
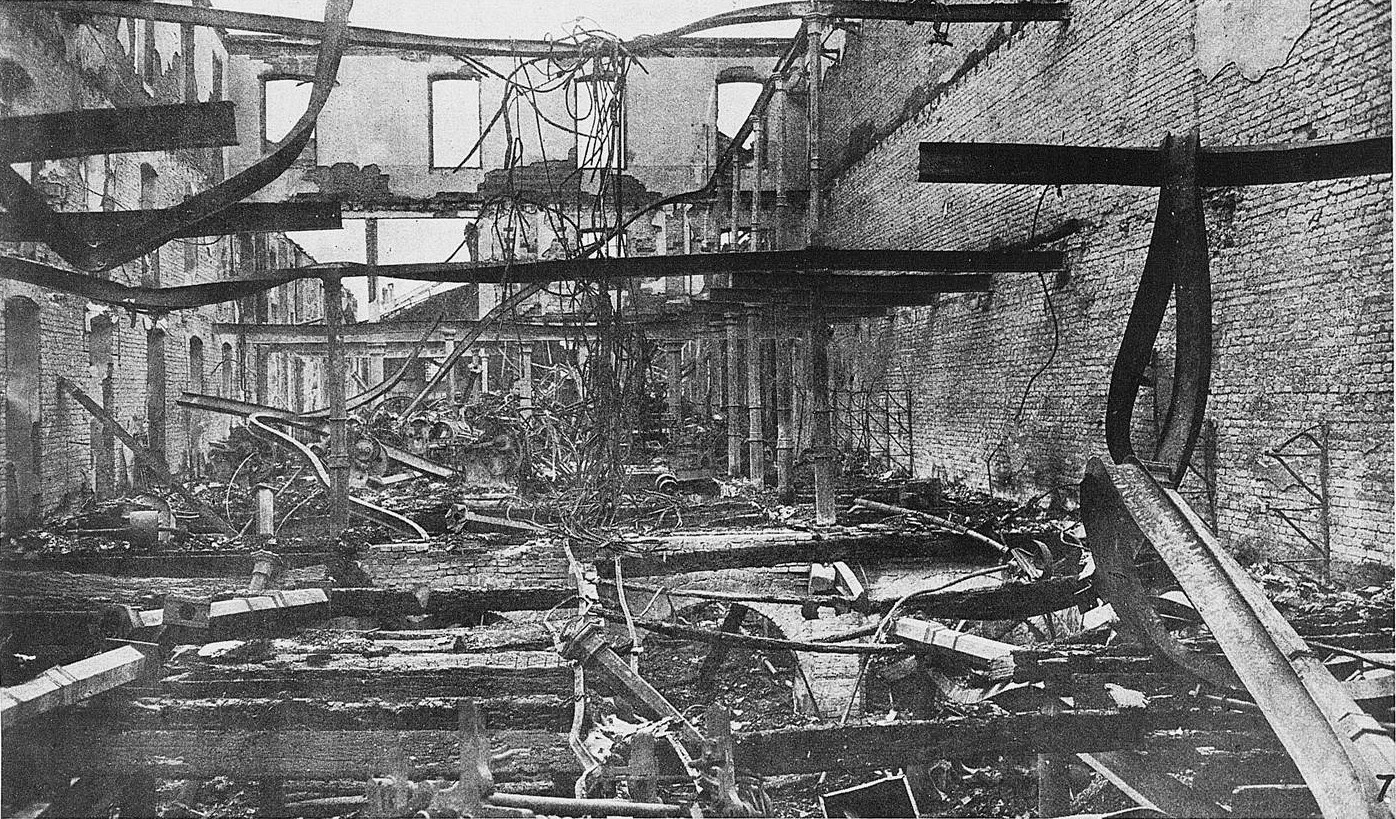
Result of fire at Duprat Workshops

According to the city government, 1,800 buildings were damaged by shells and bullets. 103 commercial and industrial establishments were damaged by fires, looting, bombings, robberies and requisitions by the rebels, with a total loss of 30,000:000$000 réis. In general, the population rebuilt their homes without government assistance. The state government's main measure to aid reconstruction was Law No. 1,972 of 26 September 1924, aimed at "assisting the victims of the recent military rebellion, assisting charitable institutions and contributing to the reconstruction of damaged temples"; 200 families, 33 hospitals and the Brazilian Red Cross were compensated. Some civil society entities and private collaborators also contributed resources. The widows and orphans of loyalist soldiers killed in combat were supported by the city government.

Light and Companhia Antarctica Paulista filed lawsuits for state compensation for their losses in the capital. Light also wanted damages for "lost profits" and forced expenses. In the legal system at the time, the State's civil liability was subjective, that is, the victims had to prove liability for the damage in order to be compensated. In 1937, after thirteen years of Light's lawsuit, Decree-Law No. 392 opened a credit for "looting and damage caused by the bombing of the capital of São Paulo during the 1924 movement".

The federal government's expenses for the revolt were financed by the Bank of Brazil, which reached the legal limit on its issuance of money between August and October. The government lost control of monetary policy precisely when it was trying, unsuccessfully, to appreciate the exchange rate and control inflation. The revolt and the unsuccessful negotiations for a loan with British creditors changed the course of economic policy for the remainder of the Bernardes government. From the end of 1924, the government abandoned federal support for the appreciation of coffee prices and carried out an orthodox economic adjustment, with fiscal austerity and monetary contraction.

=== Repression and political control ===
The government's response to the 1924 uprisings inaugurated a period of more intense political repression than that which had occurred in 1922, and the apparatus of social control created under Artur Bernardes' administration foreshadowed the repression carried out in the following decades by the Estado Novo and the military dictatorship in 1964. In December 1924, the São Paulo police created its own specialized organization for this purpose, the Department of Political and Social Order (Deops), equivalent to what the police in the federal capital had had since 1922.

During the revolt, the press in Rio de Janeiro was censored. Newspapers received news from the Secretariat of the Presidency of the Republic, while the police condemned "rumor spreaders" on the streets. The state of emergency was renewed at the end of the struggle in the capital of São Paulo, and repeatedly throughout Bernardes' government. Initially declared for the Federal District and the states of São Paulo and Rio de Janeiro, it was extended to Mato Grosso, Bahia, Sergipe, Pará and Amazonas as new rebel foci appeared; in September, it was applied in Paraná and Rio Grande do Sul. The extensions continued until the end of Bernardes' term. In São Paulo, civil servants and military officials of the Public Force involved in the revolt were expelled. The newspapers Estado de S. Paulo and Folha da Noite were punished with temporary suspensions.

The Brazilian Army and the Public Force of São Paulo adopted stricter regulations, seeking to avoid a new uprising. São Paulo's government lost confidence in its "state army". Some battalions from the capital were transferred to the interior, and the Civil Guard was created to police the city. Civil Police chiefs began to manage Public Force enlisted personnel in the policing service, while Public Force officers were transferred to administrative functions.

=== Prisons ===
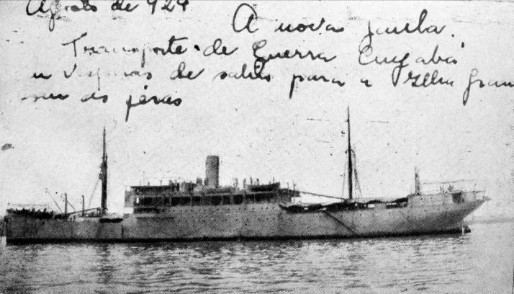
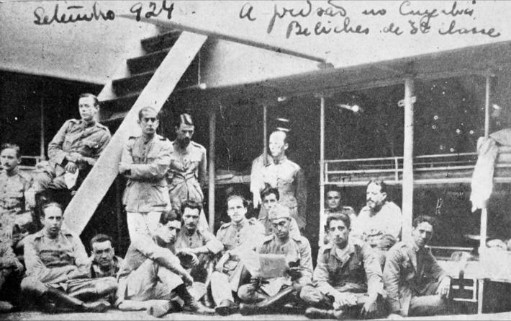
Prison ship Cuyabá

After the loyalist military victory, "the most unpleasant and thankless phase begins for the Government, which is the 'liquidation' of the revolt", in the words of Secretary of Justice Bento Bueno. Political repression made prisoners in all social classes: military (from marshals to enlisted men) and civilians, supporters of the revolt, workers, deputies, journalists and merchants. Many were not guilty, and some were only the relatives of enemies of the state. These political prisoners were deliberately mixed with common criminals.

In Rio de Janeiro, repression began from the first days of July. Under the authority of marshal Lopes da Fontoura, the police imprisoned journalists such as Mário Rodrigues and Edmundo Bittencourt, from Correio da Manhã, Diniz Júnior, from A Pátria, and Roberto de Toledo Lopes, from O Jornal; anarchist leader José Oiticica; communist Otávio Brandão; military personnel and others. Due to the lack of cells, Ilha Rasa and the ship Campos were used as prisons. This was a preventative action, and detainees were not necessarily suspected of involvement in the sedition. Foreigners in the capital, especially Russians, were investigated for a possible connection with the Russian Bolshevik movement.

In São Paulo, mass arrests began as soon as the government reoccupied the city. Lourenço Moreira Lima, arrested in Capão Bonito, estimated the number of prisoners at 10,000. Most were collaborators or supporters of the revolt, and even minors were imprisoned. Rich prisoners from the interior became sources of income for the "prison door attorneys". Organized workers, especially anarchists, were hounded for their moral support for the rebellion. Some trade unionists, anticipating repression, managed to hide before the arrival of loyalist forces, but by the end of the year, trade union activity in São Paulo had been dismantled.

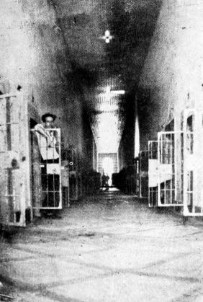
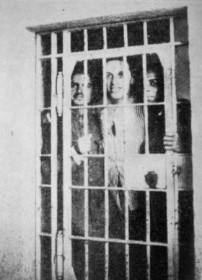
Soldiers at the House of Correction, in Rio de Janeiro

There was torture in prisons and police stations: "the rubber pipe, cold water, isolation, malnutrition and ill-treatment, all the time". The worst fate was that of the 408 São Paulo rebels who surrendered on the battlefields of Catanduvas in 1925. Along with prisoners from Rio de Janeiro and Amazonas, they were part of the 946 prisoners sent to the penal colony of Clevelândia, on Brazil's border with French Guiana, where more than 400 died of dysentery and other diseases.

The "conservative classes" also had several representatives arrested, especially Macedo Soares and Júlio de Mesquita, chosen to serve as an example for their negotiations with the rebels. Mayor Firmiano Pinto was also the target of the accusations, but he was never arrested. In December, Macedo Soares managed to go into exile. He and Firmiano Pinto were denounced by the Public Prosecutor's Office, but did not respond to the lawsuit. The Nationalist League, whose first treasurer was Macedo Soares, was closed for six months.

=== Trial ===
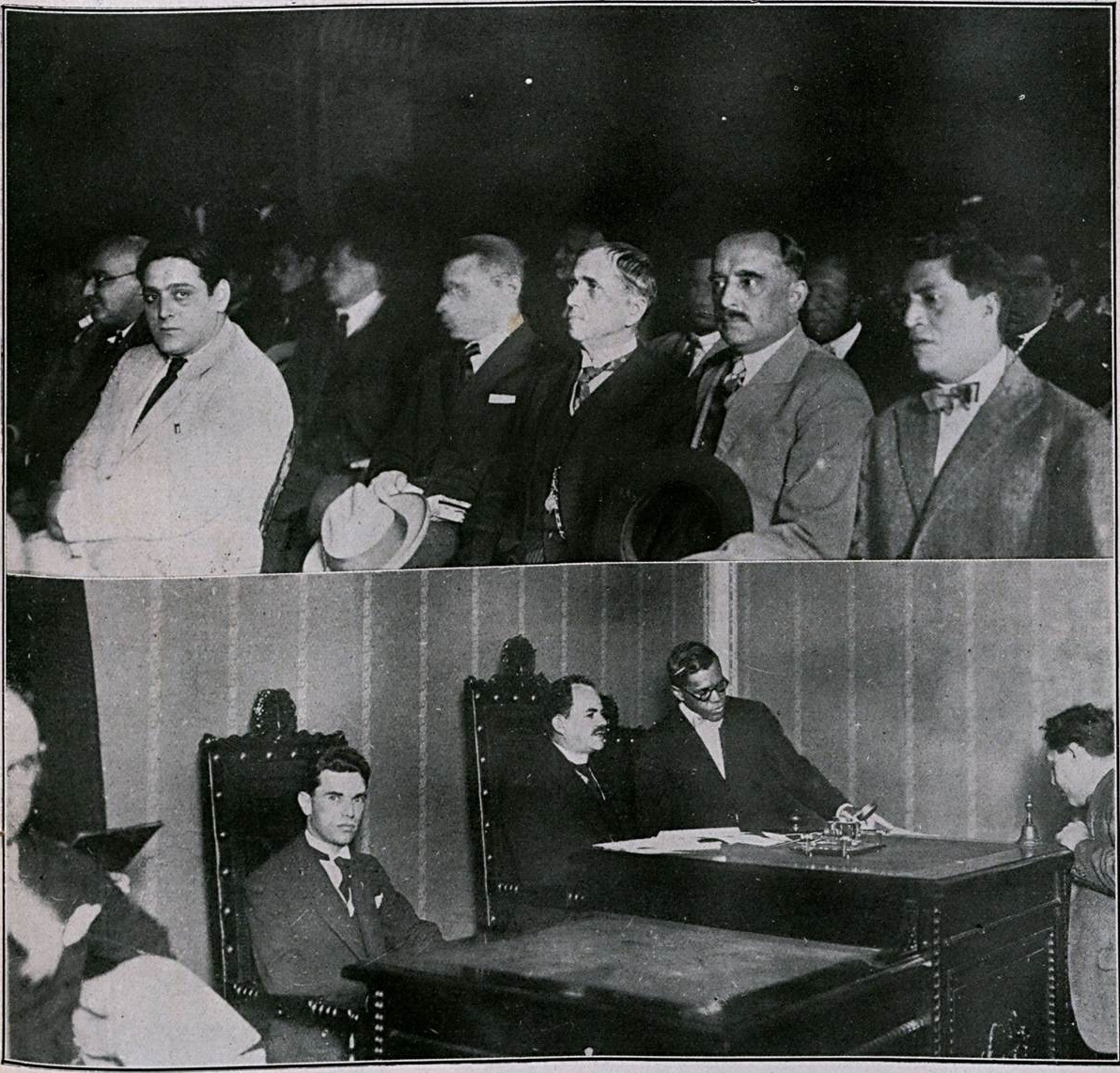
Trial session in June 1927

In the conspiracy centers and at the Luz HQ, the police seized bulletins, maps, confidential reports, command orders, encrypted messages, secret codes and private correspondence incriminating hundreds of military personnel and civilians. While the investigation was underway and fighting continued in the interior, in August, a presidential decree relaxed due process to expedite the punishment of those under investigation. Jurisdiction for judging crimes against the Constitution and the form of government was transferred from the federal jury to the section judge, for fear that a jury might be lenient. Supreme Court Justice Edmundo Lins criticized the law's objective: "it was not to provide them [the rebels] with a bed of roses, but on the contrary, a veritable Procrustean bed". The decree allowed for trials in absentia for non-bailable offenses and eliminated the statute of limitations for defendants who had taken refuge abroad. It was also applied retroactively to events that occurred before its promulgation.

667 defendants were accused of the political crime defined in Article 107 of the 1890 Penal Code of Brazil, "attempting, directly and by deed, to change the political Constitution of the Republic, or the established form of government, by violent means". There were so many defendants that they could not all fit in the Federal Court building in São Paulo and had to be accommodated in the Immigrant Hostel. Some of the defenses presented the revolt as a simple reaction to the arbitrary and unconstitutional acts of the Executive branch, with no intention to change the constitution. At the end of the trial, in 1929, 176 were convicted under article 108 ("attempting, by the same means, to change any of the articles of the Constitution"), with sentences of up to four years in prison. But many of those arrested and punished did not go through due process of law, and are outside the universe of indictees.

=== International repercussion ===
At least eighteen countries had diplomatic representatives in São Paulo, due to its economic, political, and social importance. Important parts of the city's economy were controlled by investors from France, the United States, and especially the United Kingdom. Brazilian consulates received criticism and requests for neutrality towards foreign citizens, but these were often ignored. 21 Italian citizens died in the battle and another 90 were injured. In September, the visit of prince Umberto of Savoy, heir to the Italian throne, had to be transferred from São Paulo to Salvador. The authoritarianism of the Bernardes government harmed Brazil's international image when it was seeking a permanent seat on the Council of the League of Nations. Concerned about its image abroad, the Brazilian government even censored telegrams from international news agency correspondents. United Press International and Associated Press were banned from sending any news to the United States, and an American correspondent was even arrested for a few hours. This provoked protests from the U.S. Embassy.

The Ministry of Foreign Affairs set up an intelligence service to monitor the tenentists in Argentina, Uruguay and Paraguay. Active since the capture of São Paulo, it acted systematically from the period of the Miguel Costa-Prestes Column.

=== Political fate of those involved ===
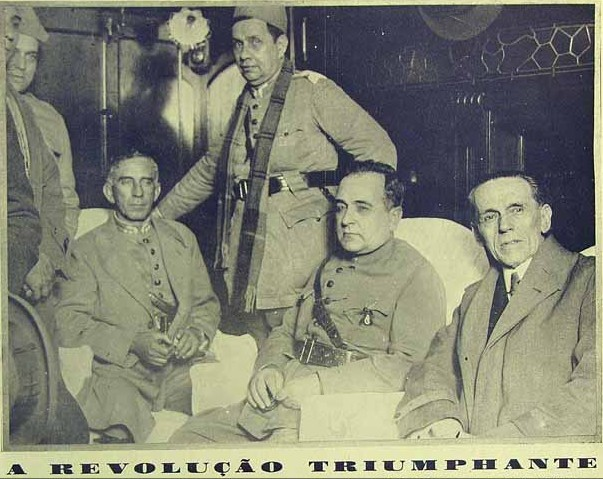
Miguel Costa (seated, left) with Getúlio Vargas in 1930

With the revolt defeated, the Republican Party of São Paulo seemed to have confirmed its hegemony in state politics. Oppositionists were all underground or apparently siding with the government. But when Washington Luís succeeded Bernardes in 1926, the press, freed from the state of emergency, revealed a degree of prestige accumulated by the tenentists. In São Paulo, the Democratic Party (PD) contested the hegemony of the PRP and explicitly associated its cause with that of the tenentes. Artur Bernardes, on the other hand, gained the reputation of destroyer of São Paulo; most books on the subject take a negative view of his bombing of the city.

Washington Luís released political prisoners, but did not grant amnesty to defendants at the trial. The first phase of tenentism came to an end in 1927. Planning began for a third armed movement, this time associated with civil political dissidents. Tenentism suffered an internal split, but was finally victorious in the Revolution of 1930. Both Artur Bernardes and part of the tenentists supported the revolution that brought Getúlio Vargas to power and ended the Old Republic. Ironically, Vargas had been one of the government's defenders in 1924, when he praised Carlos de Campos in a speech at the Chamber of Deputies, calling the tenentist uprising "criminal".

Under the new Vargas regime, Miguel Costa became Commander of the Public Force of São Paulo and Secretary of Security. He founded the Revolutionary Legion of São Paulo, while the PRP and PD united against Vargas, forming the Frente Única Paulista. Miguel Costa's organization fired back at a demonstration at its headquarters, precipitating the Constitutionalist Revolution of 1932. The constitutionalists arrested Miguel Costa, but received the support of Isidoro Dias Lopes. Artur Bernardes also sided with the constitutionalists and tried to rehabilitate his image in São Paulo. The movement failed to overthrow Vargas. Later, several former 1924 rebels moved towards socialism, such as João Cabanas and Miguel Costa, one of the founders of the Brazilian Socialist Party in 1945. Isidoro condemned the 1937 coup d'état, but by that point he had withdrawn from public life.

== Legacy ==
=== Photographs ===
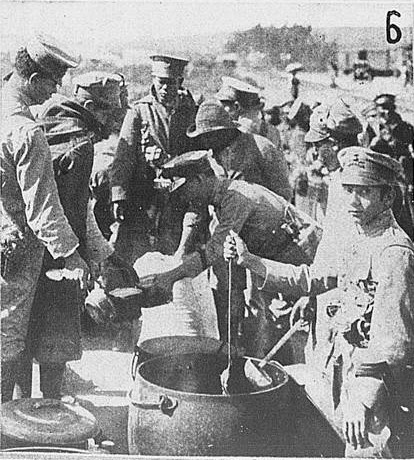
Loyalist army ranch

The São Paulo Revolt was much photographed, especially the destruction of houses and industries. Many of the photographs were gathered by Light, precisely because of the need to document the company's losses. The shocking images of the destruction fueled debate between supporters and enemies of the uprising. Some pictures reveal the physical proximity of the photographers to combatants, and even the movement of the population through the trenches, and an apparent indifference of the people. Most photographs have no known authorship; professional photojournalism was in its infancy at the time. Among the few known photographers are Aniceto de Barros Lobo and Gustavo Prugner.

The photographs are almost always open shots. In the 21st century, the original landscape is almost unrecognizable; most of 1924 São Paulo has already been demolished and rebuilt. The old city did not have its future wide avenues and skyscrapers; its profile was horizontal and there were many empty spaces with farms and floodplains between the neighborhoods.

=== Writings of the period ===
The criminal trial opened in court was one of the largest in the history of São Paulo, with 171 volumes and 18,715 pages. Letters exchanged between revolutionaries are also relevant documents. A collection called "Letters from the Revolution of 1924", under the custody of the Public Archive of the State of São Paulo, dates mainly from the exile of the Miguel Costa-Prestes Column and not from the São Paulo revolt. Another set of letters are those addressed by the population affected by the conflict to archbishop Duarte Leopoldo Silva, president of the commission responsible for compensation claims.

Memorialists and chroniclers published at least 20 books about their experiences in the conflict, among which Justiça, by José Carlos de Macedo Soares, Sob a metralha, by Ciro Costa and Eurico de Góis, Agora Nós, by Paulo Duarte, 1924: episódios da revolução de S.Paulo, by Antônio dos Santos Figueiredo, Férias de Julho, by Luiz Marcigaglia, Aventuras de uma família durante a Revolução de 1924, by Henrique Geenen, and Dias de pavor, by Aureliano Leite. Ciro Costa, Eurico de Góis and Aureliano Leite are among the few to defend the government to the point of justifying artillery bombardment.

For the paulista intellectual class, the revolt evidenced a national malaise, a risk of increasingly militarized and typically Latin American politics. A cosmopolitan, dynamic and civilized capital was the scene of excessive violence, especially from the government. The population practiced looting and was indifferent to the loyalist cause. According to Diario da Noite, the revolt shattered the illusions of democracy in Brazil. For Mário de Andrade, the psychological damage was worse than the material one. Monteiro Lobato exchanged letters with Artur Bernardes, alerting him to the divorce between politics and public opinion. In general, intellectuals contemporary to the revolt noted a moral, political, social and economic crisis, for which they expected an elitist solution, which would not come from the people. Lobato, Antônio de Sampaio Dória, Jorge Americano, Júlio de Mesquita Filho and others made diagnoses and proposed reforms. Even PRP supporters recognized the crisis.

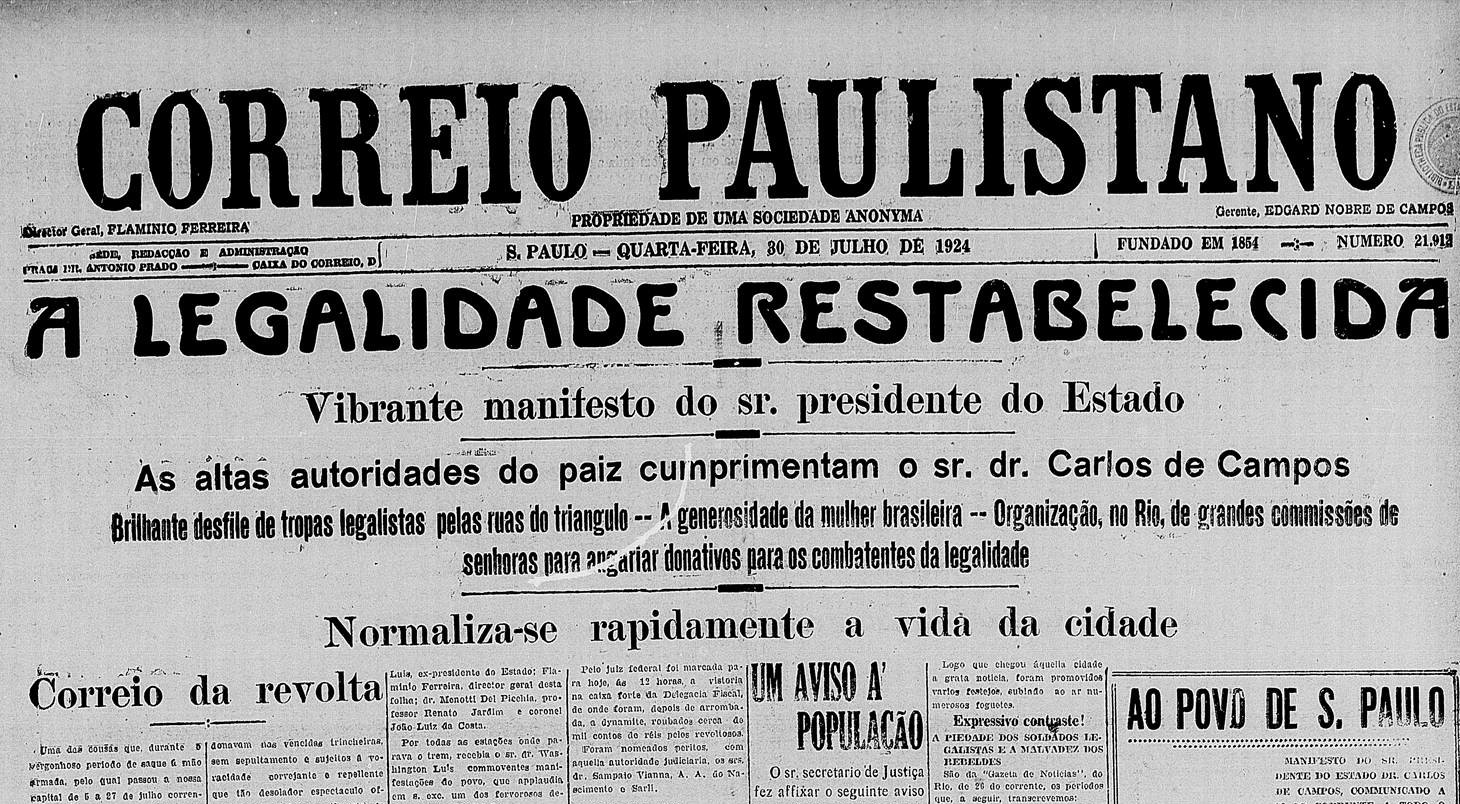
Correio Paulistano celebrates the loyalist victory in the capital

Among the military participants, loyalist Abilio de Noronha published Narrando a Verdade and O resto da verdade, defending himself against accusations of leniency towards the conspirators when he commanded the 2nd Military Region. Noronha made a harsh military criticism of the conduct of operations by general Sócrates and his subordinates. The memories of the revolutionaries are represented by works such as À guisa de depoimento, by Juarez Távora, and A Coluna da Morte, by João Cabanas.

The most influential newspapers in São Paulo at the time were Correio Paulistano, an organ of the PRP, and its rival, O Estado de S. Paulo. Correio Paulistano only returned to circulation on 28 July, while Estado de S. Paulo was the only one to circulate every day, and even then, it was reduced to two pages and controlled by rebel censors. The aftermath of the revolt took up most of the pages' space. The editorial lines of Estado de S. Paulo and Correio Paulistano were polar opposites: the latter referred to the tenentes as "bandits" and "bands of unpatriots", and the former as "rebels" and "revolutionaries". Estado de S. Paulo was officially neutral but had some sympathy for the movement.

=== Memory and oblivion ===
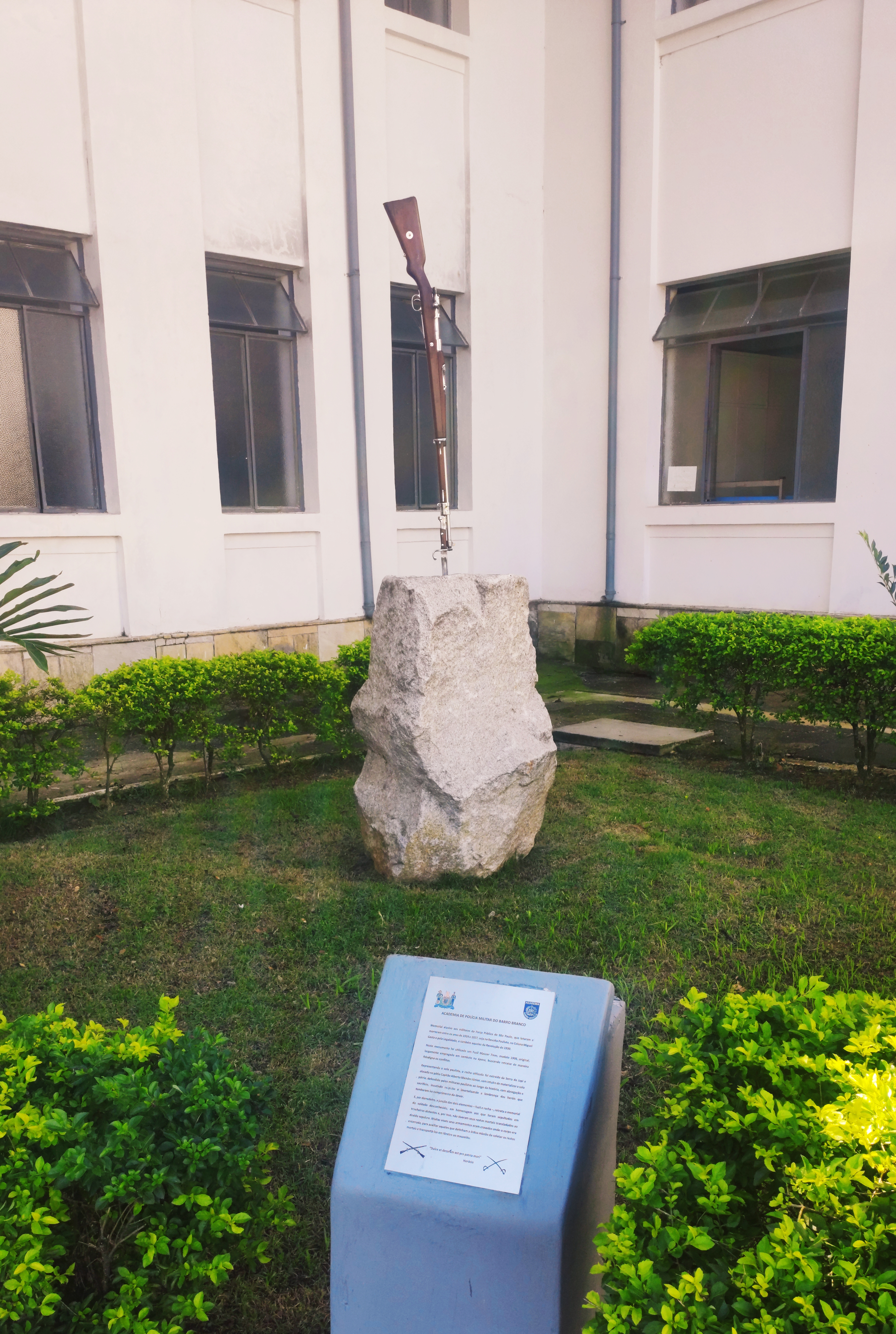
Monument to the dead of the Public Force of São Paulo in 1924 and in the following lieutenant conflicts

One of the names of the 1924 revolt is the "Forgotten Revolution". Its eyewitnesses still had many memories decades after the event, but in São Paulo, "revolution" is synonymous with the Constitutionalist Revolution of 1932. While the 1932 movement is commemorated with a state holiday, honored with monuments and street names, and assimilated as part of São Paulo's identity, the 1924 revolt was left without public references. In the press, 1924 occasionally appears in commemorative jubilees. In historiography, the revolt is not forgotten, but it is absorbed as just one of the chapters of tenentism, which, in turn, has its revolts of the 1920s overshadowed by the Revolution of 1930. Even so, the relevance of 1924 is recognized for the dimension of the conflict and its material and human losses, the contribution to the fall of the Old Republic, a few years later, and to the construction of the apparatus of social control of the Brazilian state.

During the final years of the Old Republic, São Paulo's Executive and Legislative branches did their best to denigrate the image of the revolt, describing it in terms of "treason", "crime" and "disgrace", an "affront to our culture and our civilization". Even after the 1930 Revolution, the movement was not celebrated and continued to fall into oblivion. In 1932, constitutionalist Leven Vampré recalled 1924 as an example of the federal government's disregard for São Paulo, but did not defend the movement, as its objectives were opposite to those of the Constitutionalist Revolution.

Several reasons have already been proposed for the revolt's fall into oblivion. Brazilian historiography emphasizes the great moments of rupture in the political order, and thus, 1930 takes up much more space than 1924. Even though militarily more relevant, the 1924 movement failed in its political objective. Unlike the Constitutionalist Revolution, led by the São Paulo elite, the tenentist uprising was led by outsiders and low-ranking military personnel, with the support of foreign workers. Its consequences were disastrous for both sides, and even more so for the population; the most remembered aspect of the conflict is the destruction of the city.

=== Terminology ===
Historiography uses varied terms for the event, such as the "revolt", "movement" or "revolution" of 1924, or also the "Second 5th of July". (Note: "The initial date – Second 5th of July – refers to the outbreak of the tenentist revolt in São Paulo, not coincidentally, which began exactly two years after the military uprising in Copacabana". Teixeira, Eduardo Perez (2018). A Coluna Prestes vista por O Paíz e o Correio da Manhã (1924 - 1927) (PDF) (Masters thesis). Universidade de Brasília. p. 10.) At the time, supporters of the movement labeled it a "revolution", a term of great symbolic value, and its opponents, a "subversive movement", "riot", "uprising" and "revolt". By defining the word "revolution" as a profound transformation in society, there are arguments against its use for the 1924 uprising, as it still had a commitment to the established social order and its goals for society were modest. In addition to these terms, the São Paulo revolt also acquired characteristics of a civil war: besides the scale of the destruction, the government's sovereignty was defied by a group that also considered itself representative of the nation and sought a legitimate monopoly on violence.

== See also ==
- Revolutions of Brazil
