= Foreign battalions in the São Paulo Revolt of 1924 =

The foreign battalions were three military units in the São Paulo Revolt of 1924 recruited from among immigrant communities by tenentist rebels in the city of São Paulo. 750 foreigners and their descendants, from a wide variety of nationalities, signed up; they were usually workers motivated by hunger and unemployment caused by the conflict. They formed the German, Hungarian and Italian battalions, in which even the commanders and officers were immigrants.

The largest and most active battalion was the German one. A minority of its members were World War I veterans, contributing valuable skills to the rebels' war effort. Some were immediately employed in the fighting across the city, while others worked in the maintenance and creation of ordnance in workshops behind the front lines. Part of the combatants accompanied the rebels after their withdrawal from São Paulo, at the end of July 1924, and some joined the Miguel Costa-Prestes Column in the following years. The recruitment of immigrants outraged government supporters, who called them mercenaries and emphasized the image of immigrant workers as sources of political radicalism.

== Background ==
In the 1920s, immigrants and their direct descendants formed more than half of the population of São Paulo, which reached around 700,000 inhabitants in 1924. Attracted by the rapid industrialization, foreign communities settled mainly in the working-class neighborhoods of the east of the city, such as Brás, Mooca and Belenzinho. Italians were the most numerous, with smaller populations of Spaniards, Germans, Arabs, and Japanese. The Hungarian community, with about six thousand people, was concentrated in the neighborhoods of Lapa and Vila Pompeia. Mooca and Brás were the scene of the 1917 general strike, the largest in the country until then. The São Paulo labor movement was the target of the image of the "foreign agitator", typically Italian or Spanish, disseminating socialist or anarchist ideas.

On 5 July 1924, tenentists led by general Isidoro Dias Lopes took up arms in the city against the federal government of Artur Bernardes. The resulting urban warfare brought starvation and violence to the civilian population. From 11 April, loyalist forces began an intense artillery bombardment, which claimed, for the most part, the lives of civilians, especially in the working-class neighborhoods. Employment in factories and workshops came to a standstill, while food supplies were in crisis. Among the population, there was a perception that the government specifically attacked the Italians of Brás and Mooca. Previously existing grievances and the loyalist bombardment created popular support for the rebels. It was in this context that the revolutionaries enlisted volunteers to reinforce their front lines.

== Formation and composition ==
The battalions were organized after 20 July, when the financial conditions of many of their members had already deteriorated from days of work interruption. The most cited reasons for joining, according to the testimonies collected after the revolt, were precisely the lack of resources, hunger and unemployment. Some were lured by the revolutionaries' promises— at least 50 bushels of land inland, alongside a railroad track. According to journalist Milton Heller, this commitment was never taken seriously by the revolutionary leadership. But the immediate benefits were attractive: the pay was 10,000 réis for soldiers, 25,000 for lieutenants and 30,000 for captains. The revolutionary command paid 20 days in advance. Other participants, in their testimonies, cited coercion by the revolutionaries, or the fear of being shot after the government returned to the city. In either case, it was common for neighbors and relatives to volunteer.

The revolutionaries did not accept any volunteers, but only those who accepted or did not interfere with their political project; accordingly, the offer of support from leftist proletarian leaders was turned down. Even so, ideological motivations may explain the participation of some "middle class" volunteers (journalists, lawyers and bank employees). There were fighters inspired by socialist, communist, and anarchist ideas, especially within the Italian battalion.

The number of foreign fighters was 700 or 750, organized into three battalions: German, Hungarian, and Italian. Its participants were not restricted to these three nationalities: their origins also included Austria, Switzerland, the Netherlands, Denmark, Sweden, Czechoslovakia, Yugoslavia, Romania, Poland, Russia, Portugal and Spain. Some were Brazilians. Officers were chosen from among those who could prove a post previously held in a European army. The commanders were directly subordinate to the revolutionary staff and had an interpreter and a liaison officer. In the German battalion, officers did not communicate with the troops in Portuguese, and all documentation was written in German; the Hungarian battalion had a similar organization.

The so-called "Patriotic Battalion of the German Colony" was the largest and most militarily active of the three. Its membership, including Austrians, Swiss, Danes, and Swedes, numbered 300 men. Another report quantified 650 men, of which 200 would be German, 80 Italian and 370 Brazilian. The most cited leader in the testimonies of participants was captain Arnaldo Kuhn; others mentioned João Joaquim Tuchen, Antonio Missoni and Henrique Schulz. The organization's headquarters were on Liberdade Avenue.

The Hungarian Patriotic Battalion, or "Hungarian Cavalry Squadron", would have numbered 180, including Poles, Romanians, and Czechoslovaks. Commanded by Maximiliano Agid, it was headquartered on Tiradentes Avenue. Documentation seized from that battalion listed 122 members.

The Italian battalion was organized by Lamberti Sorrentino, Aldo Mario Geri and Ítalo Landucci. It numbered about 60 men, of which 40 were Italians and the rest were Portuguese, Spanish and Brazilian. This number is very small considering the large Italian population in the city. This can be explained by the repression of the trade union movement, in which Italians actively participated, before the revolt. The Italian community was older and more structured, therefore the battalion's members had greater chances of escaping the police and its documentation, unlike the other two, was not seized by government forces, reducing the availability of information.

== Contribution to the revolt ==
The German battalion was immediately employed on the front lines, while the Hungarian one initially served as mounted police, preventing looting and guarding the abandoned houses. The immigrants' previous World War I experiences were valuable in combat. However, most of the members were not professional soldiers; some were as young as 18 years old. Among the Germans there were gunners, pilots, machine gun experts and other war specialties; the defeat of the loyalists' Renault FT-17 tanks is attributed to the previous experience of this battalion. On the other hand, historian Glauco Carneiro made a negative assessment: "the mercenaries, with rare exceptions, did not prove to be very useful or brave; they were mere adventurers seeking material results"; "as a rule, they had an appalling waste of ammunition, incessant fire against alleged loyalist positions, in a suspicious effort to avoid the adversary attack".

Foreigners also contributed behind the front lines in the production and maintenance of war material. Maximiliano Agid personally supervised the production of grenades and incendiary bombs in the São Paulo Railway workshops. German mechanic Ewald Bremesck headed the machine gun maintenance section, and Gerhard Nagel, who served in the Imperial German Army's artillery, was responsible for gun maintenance. Some of these foreigners collaborated with the rebels without participating in the battalions, such as the Spaniard Manoel García Senra, superintendent of the São Paulo Railway, who participated in the production of armored cars.

At the end of July 1924, the rebels withdrew from the city of São Paulo, heading inland. At least 180 fighters from the German battalion and 100 from the Hungarian battalion accompanied this movement, being joined, along the way, by immigrants residing in the interior, while other fighters deserted. Since leaving the city, the revolutionary command did not want to dismiss the foreigners, handing them over to government retaliation, but decided to allow their dismissal where they found safety and means for a new life.

The Germans participated in the defense of Botucatu, on 30 July. When the revolutionaries finally reached São Paulo's border with Mato Grosso, at Presidente Epitácio, the Hungarian unit, still present on 7 August, was disarmed due to the risk of desertion. Still, some Hungarians continued to fight in the revolutionary army. Foreigners made up about half of the 570 men in the 3rd Revolutionary Battalion, forming its shock troops. The battalion, led by Juarez Távora, began an offensive in Mato Grosso on 17 August. This raid was defeated with heavy casualties at Campo Japonês, in the vicinity of Três Lagoas. More than half of the Germans indicted by the police were captured in that battle.

The revolutionaries continued to western Paraná, where the fighting continued until April 1925. The battalions no longer existed, but some of the original foreigners were still in their midst. In the new campaign, the foreign composition of the revolutionary army was reinforced by many Paraguayans. In April, seventy remnants of the former German battalion defected to Paraguay, when logistical difficulties prevented captain Kuhn from fulfilling his contract commitments. The São Paulo revolutionaries joined the Rio Grande do Sul rebels and formed the Miguel Costa-Prestes Column, which remained in the struggle for the interior of the country. Some of its members were enlisted immigrants since 1924. Ítalo Landucci, from the Italian battalion, became Luís Carlos Prestes' trusted man.

== Reactions ==
The use of so-called "foreign mercenaries" in a Brazilian internal conflict was one of the facts that most outraged the loyalists. Artur Bernardes criticized them in his Manifesto à Nação, published later in 1924, and Correio Paulistano, the official newspaper of the Republican Party of São Paulo, called them a "gang of killers, who, on generous pay, proposed to looting and razing". The emphasis of the authorities and the press on condemning the immigrants referred to the image of foreigners as a threat, and to the fear of "Bolshevization" of the revolt. This was used to reinforce police repression of the labor movement and political dissidents.

After the rebels left the city of São Paulo, the amount of documents seized by the loyalists was enough to set up a military police inquiry exclusively for foreign participants. In 1929, eleven of them received the highest sentence of all those involved in the revolt, four years in prison, as accomplices in the highest degree. However, only a minority of participants were indicted, and the solidarity of immigrant communities made the investigation difficult. Some combatants, with the connivance of neighborhoods and colonies, fled without leaving any clues for the police. The testimonies of the accused narrated events, but often omitted names, or only named leaders and dead in combat. Even Ítalo Landucci, who was even photographed with the command of the Prestes Column, was acquitted for lack of evidence.
