= Urban combat in the São Paulo Revolt of 1924 =

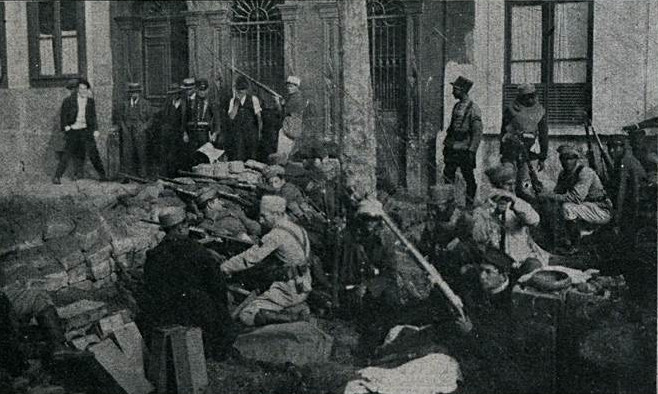
Trench on Guaianases Street, used by the rebels in the attack on the Campos Elíseos Palace

The urban combat of the São Paulo Revolt of 1924 was the most violent of its kind in Brazilian history, raging in the city of São Paulo from 5 to 27 July 1924. Rebel tenentist revolutionaries, led by general Isidoro Dias Lopes, intended to take over the city in a few hours, but were trapped in combat in the central region against forces loyal to the government of president Artur Bernardes. On 8 July, the loyalists withdrew to the city's outskirts, organizing themselves in general Eduardo Sócrates' "Division of Operations in the State of São Paulo", restarting the fight in the working-class neighborhoods to the south and east of the city. There was not a complete siege; the rebels had roads open to their territory inland, along which they withdrew from the city on the night of 27 July and continued their rebellion.

In the first hours of the revolt, the rebels took over units of the Brazilian Army and the main barracks complex of the Public Force of São Paulo in the Luz neighborhood. The rebels did not get the expected reinforcements from the 4th Infantry Regiment, they did not manage to cut the telegraph communications in time, they were repelled in the attack on the Campos Elíseos Palace, seat of the state government, and canceled their plans to invade Rio de Janeiro due to the 4th Battalion of the Public Force changing sides, in Luz. Both sides had about a thousand combatants at the start, and the first few days of fighting were indecisive. Makeshift trenches crowded the city's center. On 8 July, artillery pressure against São Paulo governor Carlos de Campos led him to abandon the center, and loyalist troops did the same. This decision was controversial, as it handed the city over to the rebels who, prior to that point, were thinking of giving up.

With their command post in Guaiaúna, in Penha, the loyalists, divided into five brigades, began an offensive in a semicircle from Ipiranga to Vila Maria, concentrated on the tracks of the São Paulo and Central do Brasil Railways. Continuous reinforcements from the Brazilian Army, Navy and other states' Public Forces gave them a great numerical advantage (about 15 thousand soldiers against more than 3 thousand rebels) and in artillery, with which an intense bombardment was launched from 11 July, hitting mainly civilian targets. The government controlled the hills around the city, while the rebels had observation positions atop factories and other buildings. Street barricades were rudimentary, but a motorized reserve in Luz responded to loyalist attacks.

The efficiency of the government's offensive was criticized on several points by loyalist general Abílio de Noronha. The most aggressive brigade, belonging to general Tertuliano Potiguara, in Mooca, exposed its flanks on 14 July and was forced to retreat, exposing the right flank of the Carlos Arlindo brigade, which lost its gains in Liberdade and Cambuci. But government pressure continued, even using tanks and military aviation. The rebels improvised these weapons as best as they could, building an armored train and recruiting battalions of immigrants. From 23 to 27 July the loyalists conquered important strongholds such as Largo do Cambuci, Fábrica Antárctica, Cotonifício (Cotton Factory) Crespi and Hipódromo da Mooca. The government's pressure was insufficient to lock the rebels, who retreated by train at night with their army largely intact. Only on the morning of 28 July did the government realize that the rebels had left the city.

== Participating units ==
Both sides of the conflict had a mixed composition of federal and state regular forces. The rebels incorporated units from the Brazilian Army and the Public Force of São Paulo. Against them, loyalists from these two corporations and more from the Brazilian Navy and state forces from Minas Gerais, Rio de Janeiro, Espírito Santo and Rio Grande do Sul fought against them.

The infantry of the Army and the Public Forces were equivalent in doctrine, armament and material. The soldiers of the Public Force of São Paulo, as professional volunteers, were even better trained than the Army's conscripts. (Note: Mandatory military service had recently been implemented in the Brazilian Army, see Sortition Law.) Under the influence of the French Military Mission, the Army's tactics had recently incorporated the lessons of World War I, dividing the troops into small machine-gun-centered combat groups, dispersing to avoid enemy automatic weapons fire, and advancing by fire and movement. The Public Force of São Paulo also had its own French instructional mission. Soldiers can be distinguished in photographs by their uniforms; the Army used the color khaki, and the Public Force, dark blue or white.

Fighters in São Paulo

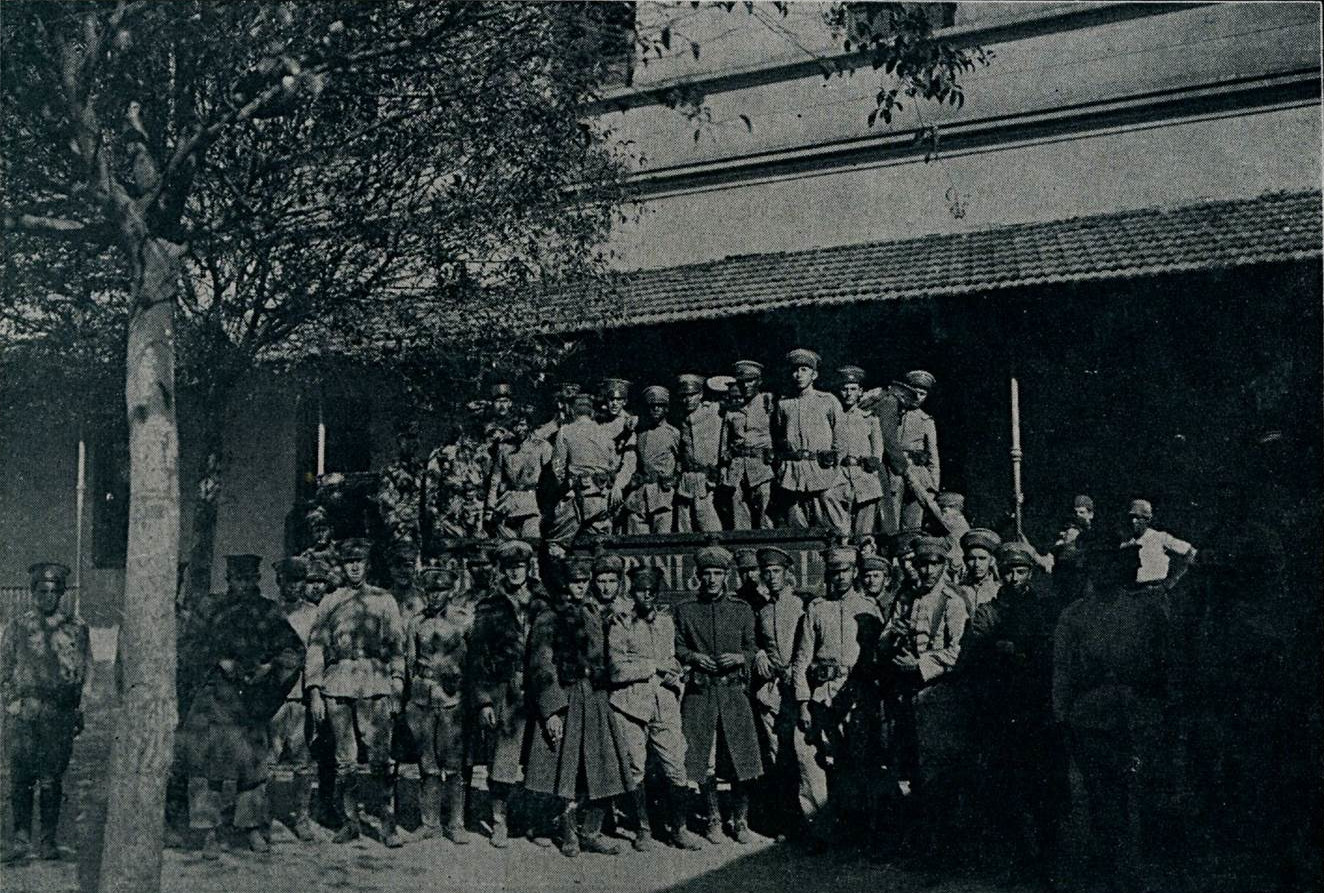
Brazilian Army

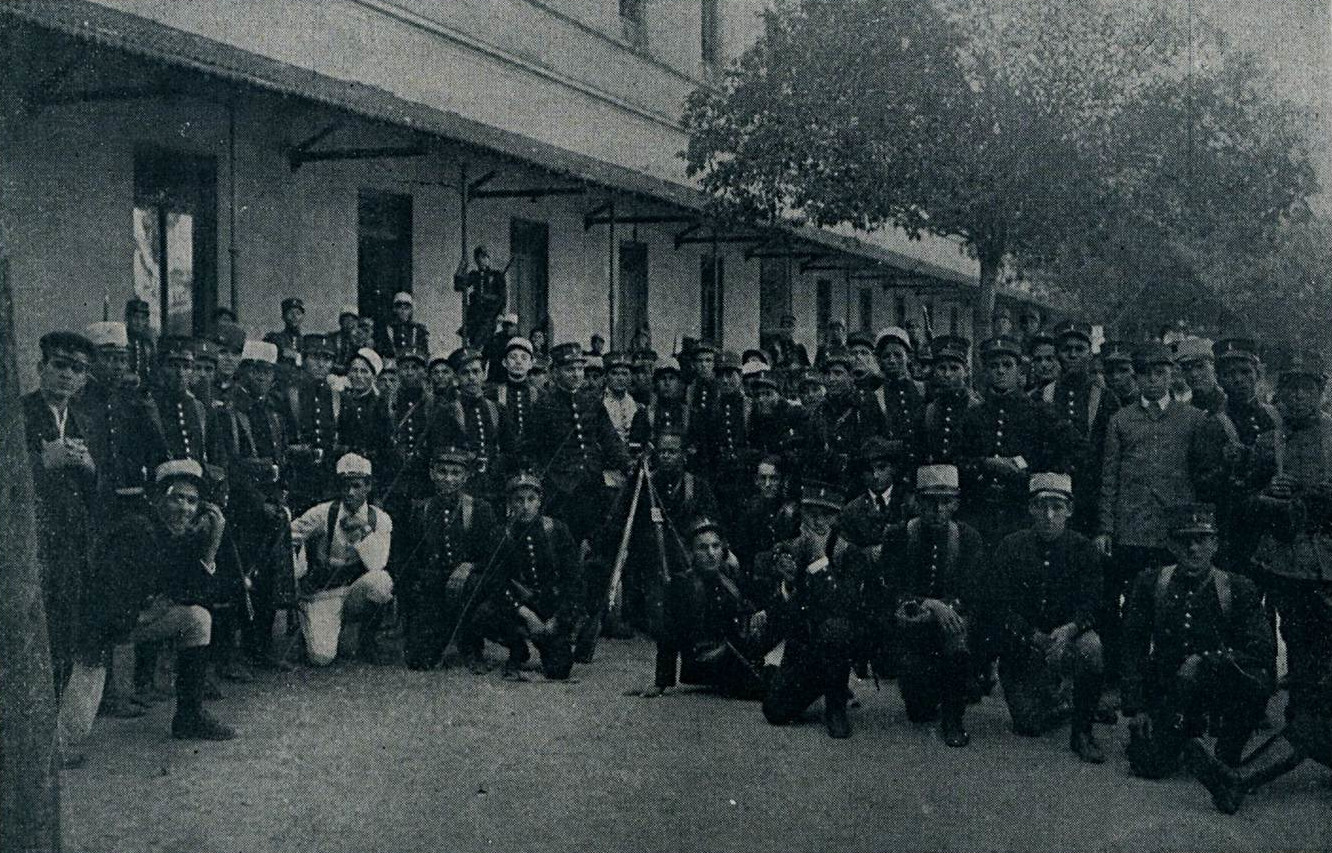
Public Force of São Paulo

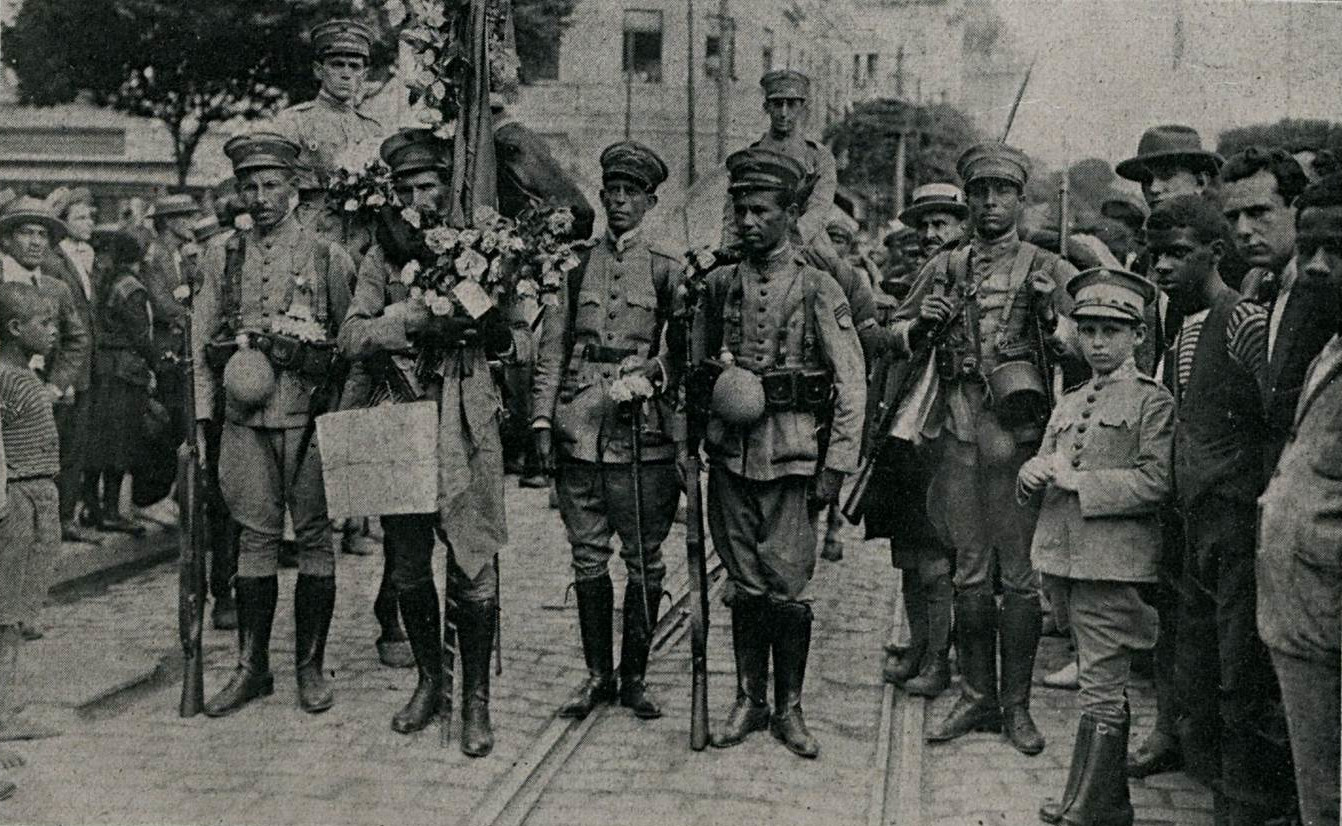
Public Force of Rio de Janeiro

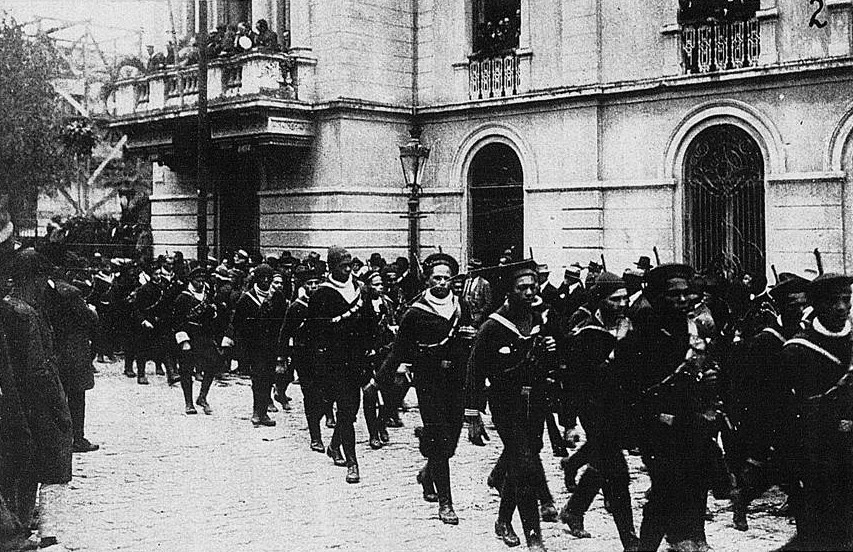
Brazilian Navy

== First phase (5-8 July) ==
=== Plan of action ===
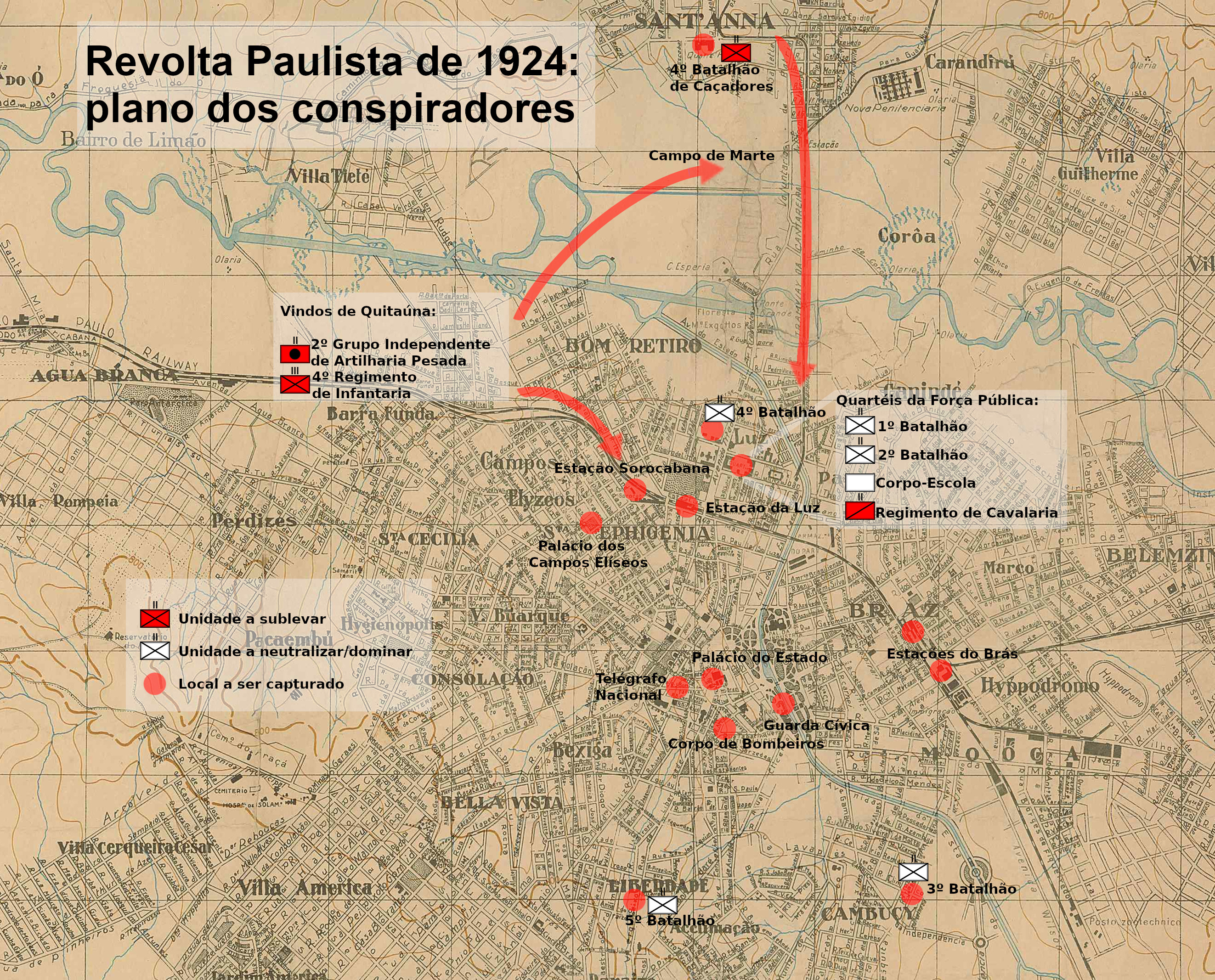
The conspirators' plan

The revolt was planned by tenentist officers with the final goal of removing the president of Brazil, Artur Bernardes, from Rio de Janeiro. São Paulo, the starting point of the uprising, would witness a few hours of conflict; the city would be captured in a fulminating attack, based on audacity and surprise, and from there, they would be joined by conspirators and sympathizers in other garrisons and quickly massed forces against the Federal District. But everything depended on the immediate capture of São Paulo.

The conspirators chose retired general Isidoro Dias Lopes as their leader, but plans were already in place when he assumed that position. To maintain secrecy and speed, the beginning of the uprising would take place in a few barracks: the 4th Battalion of Caçadores (BC), in Santana, the Cavalry Regiment of the Public Force, in Luz, and, in Quitaúna, the 4th Infantry Regiment (RI), the 2nd Independent Group of Heavy Artillery (GIAP) and the Train Company. In the 4th BC, the troops were previously persuaded by captain Newton Estillac Leal and lieutenants Asdrúbal Gwyer de Azevedo and Luiz Castro Afilhado. At dawn, captain Joaquim Távora and lieutenant Eduardo Gomes would pick up soldiers from that barracks and head to the Public Force barracks complex in Luz, where they would have the crucial support of the Cavalry Regiment inspector, major Miguel Costa. In addition to this regiment, the neighborhood hosted the 1st, 2nd and 4th Infantry Battalions or Public Force Battalions (BFP), the School-Corps and the Public Prison.

In advance, lieutenants Filinto Müller and Custódio de Oliveira would take a battery of cannons from the 2nd GIAP to Campo de Marte, to provide fire support. Custódio de Oliveira would return to the barracks in Quitaúna, where he would help a group of revolutionaries, led by captain Juarez Távora, to rebel the 4th Infantry Regiment. This regiment, transported in rented cars in a garage in São Caetano, would carry out the second phase of the plan, storming the barracks of the 3rd and 5th Infantry Battalions, the Fire Brigade, the Secretariat of Justice, the State Palace, the Civil Guard Headquarters and the Campos Elíseos Palace, seat of the state government. Lieutenant Villa Nova, commander of the palace guard corps, had pledged his support to the uprising.

Telephone, telegraph, and rail connections would be cut, delaying the government's response. From the National Telegraph, the news of the revolution would be broadcast to the garrisons in the other states. All strategic points in the city would quickly be under control. With that done, open combat in the center of the city would not be necessary. The plan required a lot: rapid progress and buy-in from other units. The government's victory condition was much simpler, just keeping the loyalist forces together and stalling the rebels in prolonged urban combat.

=== Capture of the barracks at Luz ===
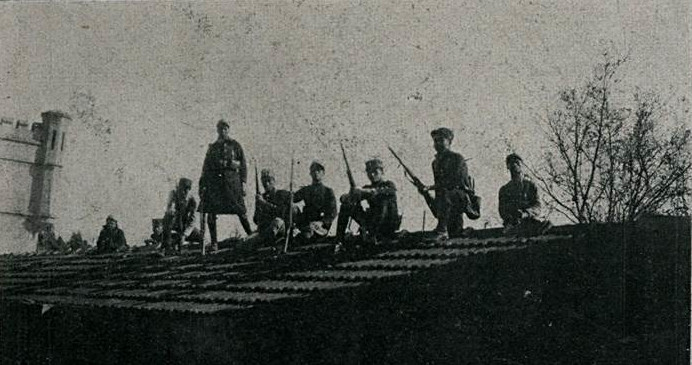
Sentinels on the roof of the 1st Battalion of the Public Force

For security reasons, only the leaders knew the date of the uprising. Isidoro Dias Lopes was expected in São Paulo on the morning of 4 July, but he arrived 20 hours late, disrupting the plan's execution. On 4 July, lieutenants Filinto Müller and Custódio de Oliveira took a cannon battery from the 2nd GIAP to Ponte Pequena, on the pretext of exercises. On the way, a cannon wheel passed over Oliveira's foot, he was delayed, and in a few hours he was arrested. At 03:00 on the morning of 5 July, a convoy of taxis with revolutionaries led by Juarez Távora approached the barracks in Quitaúna. In the absence of their internal liaison (Custódio), and armed only with pistols, they thought that an attack on the barracks would be suicide and returned to São Paulo. On the way, they realized another mistake: they forgot to order the cut of telegraphic communications.

The first phase started according to plan. In Santana, the 4th BC was revolted at 03:00. The commander was absent and the troops were led to Luz. There were only 80 soldiers; the bulk of the unit, about 400 men, were absent as it was Saturday. At 04:15, this contingent surrounded the barracks of the Public Force. Índio do Brasil, captain of the Public Force, asked a sentry sergeant in one of the barracks to inspect the ammunition. 30 soldiers and two army lieutenants entered the unguarded door, arrested the officers who were sleeping in the barracks and led the troops to the Cavalry Regiment. In this unit, Miguel Costa, with a revolver in hand, arrested his commander, put the soldiers in formation and ordered the soldier's call bell to sound, signaling the success of the revolt. The commander of the Public Force, colonel Quirino Ferreira, was awakened in his home by Juarez Távora and taken to jail in his pajamas. The entire complex fell without resistance. Isidoro Dias Lopes installed the revolutionary command in the general headquarters of the Public Force, and Miguel Costa assumed command of the corporation.

A detachment of 15 soldiers from the Cavalry Regiment, led by lieutenant José de Oliveira França, occupied the Sorocabana Station; lieutenant João Cabanas, with another 15 men, interrupted traffic at the Luz Station, positioned machine guns in the tower and controlled the telegraph; lieutenant Arlindo de Oliveira, with 30 soldiers, entrenched the North and Brás Stations. With these stations, access to Rio de Janeiro and Santos was under control.

=== Unforeseen events in the plan's execution ===
General Abilio de Noronha, informed of the revolt in the 4th BC at 04:30, alerted the state government and the Ministry of War and in half an hour visited this barracks, where the commander had just arrived. Revolutionary officers had already moved to the city center, and the barracks were again under government control. The commander of the 2nd RM proceeded to the barracks of the 4th Battalion of the Public Force at 5:30 and, without firing a shot, asserted his authority, arrested the sentries of the 4th BC who were on guard and released the loyalist officers. When trying to do the same in the School Corps, he was arrested by general Isidoro, but he and other loyalist officers created the first unforeseen events in the revolt; the rebels were not the only ones to pull off actions of audacity and presence of mind.

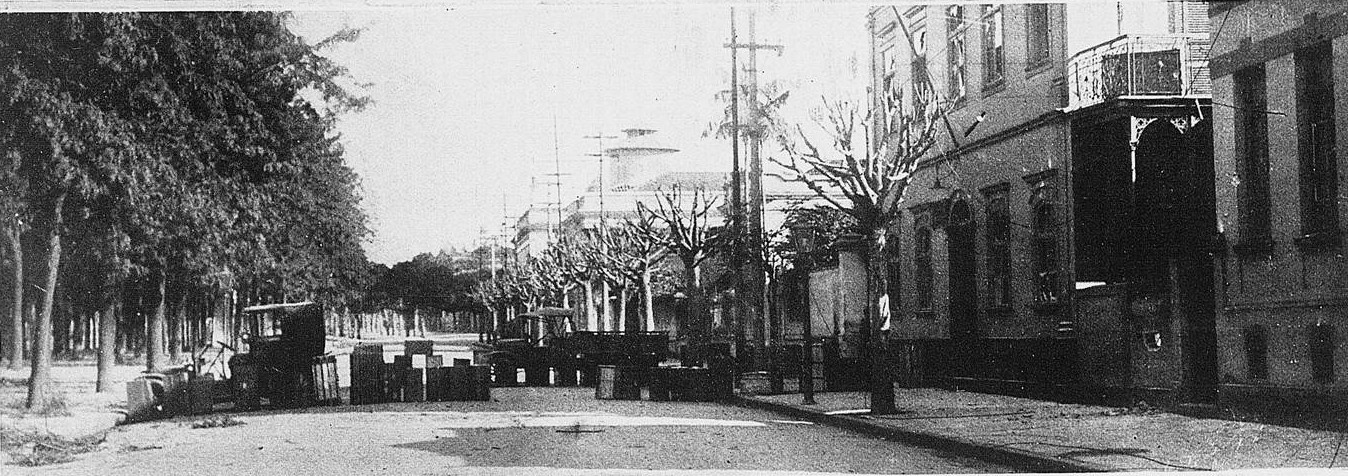
Positions around the headquarters of the 4th Battalion of the Public Force

Jaurez Távora ordered lieutenant Villa Nova to present the guards of the Campos Elíseos Palace to Miguel Costa, in the Luz square. But the rebels did not know that Villa Nova was a government informant. Instead of organizing the guard, he notified his superiors. Major Marcílio Franco, head of the Casa Militar, organized a defense with 27 men from the Civil Guard and the Fire Department. Then, Távora went to the barracks of the 4th BFP. At 6:30 am, he and his companions still did not realize that the barracks, silent, had changed sides. Over the course of an hour, dozens of soldiers and officers who entered this barracks were arrested, including captains Joaquim and Juarez Távora and lieutenant Castro Afilhado. It was a great loss; Joaquim Távora was the rebels' main strategist.

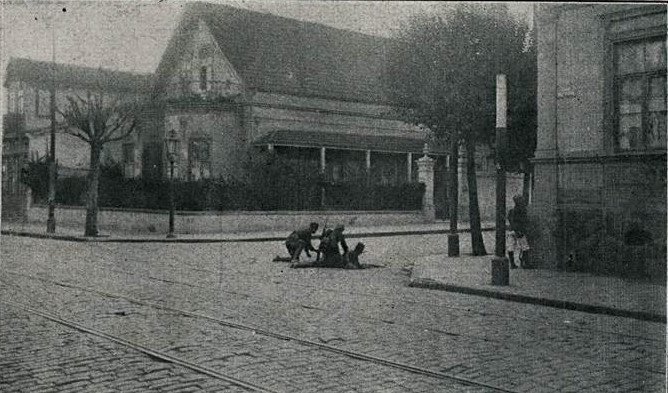
Attackers on the Campos Elíseos Palace positioning a machine gun

The cut of communications with Rio de Janeiro, through the occupation of the National Telegraph Office by the rebels, occurred a few hours late and was short-lived. The station was recovered without combat by loyalists from the 1st BFP, as lieutenant Ari Cruz, one of the revolutionary leaders who occupied it, was deceived: when he saw the arrival of an infantry company from the Public Force, he assumed that they were there to replace the guard. Cruz then fulfilled the military formality and left the place. Lieutenant Simas Enéas, who distributed encrypted telegrams to the rest of the country, escaped through the back door.

In the absence of the 4th RI, Newton Estillac Leal attacked the Campos Elíseos Palace with about 100 policemen. This first attempt, at 7:00 am or 7:30 am, was already late, due to the delay in delivering ammunition to the 4th BC. At the corners of Glete and Nothmann lanes, two machine guns were aimed at the building, but Major Marcílio Franco had already distributed ammunition to the guards. Before any firefight broke out, he walked the 30 meters to the Glete lane and took one of the machine guns, unimpeded by the approximately forty rebels in that position. Franco ran back to the palace, the other machine gun opened fire and the guard reacted. After fifteen minutes of firefight, Estillac Leal called off the attack.

=== Initial strategic situation ===
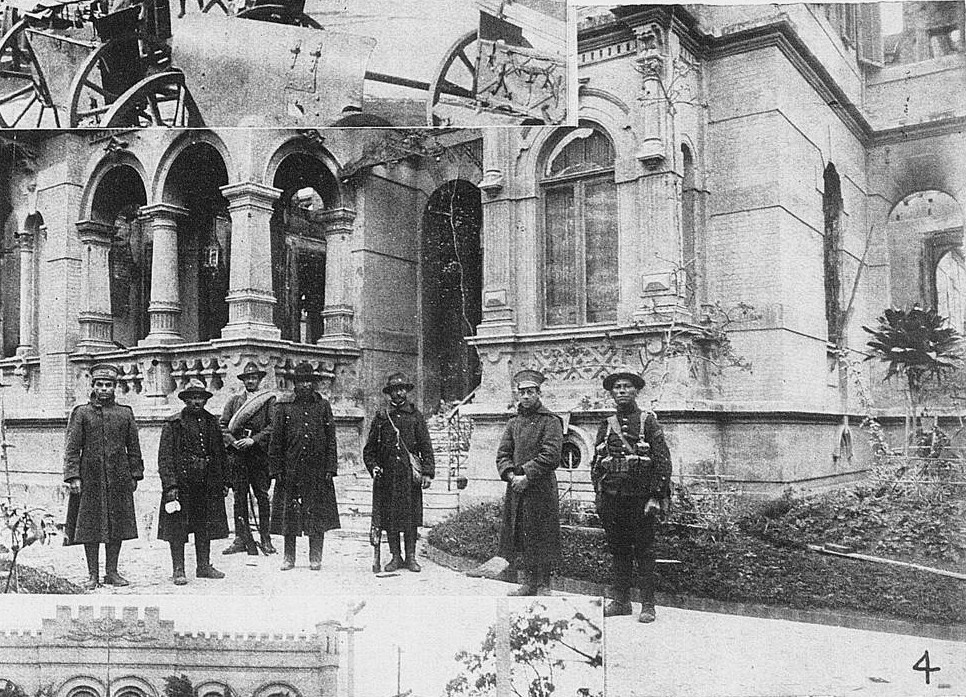
The Public Force headquarters

The failure to occupy São Paulo in a few hours, as planned, derailed the rebels' entire "general march of operations". The loss of the 4th BFP threatened all the headquarters of Luz and forced the revolutionary command to cancel the trips to Santos and Rio de Janeiro in order to consolidate the positions within São Paulo. While counterrevolts held back the movement's geographic reach in its early days, the federal government was fully informed and took action, declaring a state of emergency and closing access to Paraná, Santos, and Rio de Janeiro.

By the morning of 5 July, both sides had approximately 1,000 fighters. (Note: Silva 1971, p. 396, citing Noronha 1924, pp. 114–115. The actual strength of the Public Force was around 6,500 men, 70% of the legal force. The 3rd, 4th and 5th Battalions had only a small staff in the barracks for guard duty, as they supplied the detachments in the interior of the state. The Army units were very low in numbers. The rebels had the entire Cavalry Regiment, with 500 men, more than half of the soldiers from the 2nd GIAP, close to 100 from the 4th RI, 80 from the 4th BC and a maximum of 200 soldiers from the School Corps and the 1st and 2nd BFPs. The government had 300 men from the Fire Department, 500 from the Civic Guard, 100 from the 4th BC and elements from the rest of the Public Force.) The offensive initiative remained with the revolutionaries, but they now needed to improvise a new strategy. Until the 8th, the situation was undefined, with both sides gaining and losing positions. Instead of the planned maneuver warfare in the battlefield, the revolutionaries found a new type of war, static and urban, for which they had not prepared.

On the 6th, the revolutionaries had reinforcements from the 4th RI and the 2nd Mountain Artillery Group (GAM), from Jundiaí. At night the government received the 5th and 6th RIs, respectively from Lorena and Caçapava. The loyalists planned an offensive, but major Cabral Velho, from the 6th RI, joined the revolt and took almost the entire regiment and another company from the 5th RI with him, totaling a maximum of 400 enlisted men. That same night, a battalion of sailors from the battleship Minas Geraes and marines, armed with two 75 mm Armstrong cannons, came from Santos to reinforce the loyalists. The battalion went up the São Paulo Railway, joining two Krupp 75 mm guns from the 3rd Coastal Artillery Group along the way.

Before daybreak, the Navy battalion found its passage obstructed by an overturned locomotive at Ipiranga Station. The revolutionaries attacked this column, and the sailors, inexperienced in fighting on land, suffered 30 casualties, including four dead. Still, the Navy broke through the siege and reinforced the loyalists in the city. On that 7th, in addition to the 300–500 sailors, the government also received some detachments from the Public Force from the interior and 200 men from the 2nd Divisional Cavalry Regiment (RCD), from Pirassununga. (Note: Silva 1971, p. 397, citing Abílio de Noronha. Mendonça 1997, p. 100 quantifies more sailors: 470 disembarked, to which were added at least 28 from Tiro Naval de Santos.)

=== Combats for the city's center ===
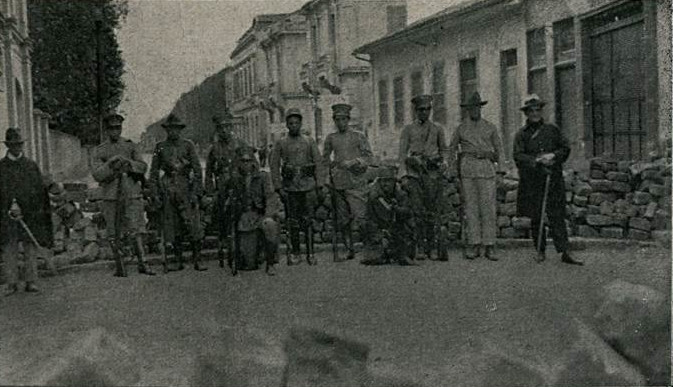
Barricades in the city center

There was uninterrupted fighting from 5 to 8 July, fought between patrols and between barricades, without the commitment of large troops. The fighting was concentrated in the neighborhoods of Luz and Campos Elíseos, in the surroundings of the Anhangabaú valley and in the Paissandu, Santa Ifigênia and São Bento squares. Trenches were improvised with uprooted cobblestones, and the tops of hills and buildings were disputed. Rebels often moved from building to building across rooftops at night, bypassing loyalist defenses. They fought almost non-stop in the trenches, resting on bales of alfalfa on nights with an average temperature of seven degrees.

The heart of the revolutionary territory was the Luz barracks complex, but maneuvers and groupings on Tiradentes Avenue and neighboring streets were made impossible by the machine guns of the 4th BFP, where forty loyalists were under siege. Jardim da Luz was closed and guarded to serve as a prison for Public Force personnel who did not want to join. The Episcopal Seminary, on São Caetano Street, was an entrenched position.

In turn, the loyalists centralized their defense effort in the Campos Elíseos Palace. Command of the 2nd Military Region was assumed by general Estanislau Pamplona, and that of the Public Force, by lieutenant colonel Pedro Dias de Campos. Shortly after the first invasion, defenders barricaded themselves and laid out coils of barbed wire, lending a First World War appearance to one of the capital's noblest areas. The HQ of the 2nd Military Region, on Conselheiro Crispiniano Street, and the city center were already garrisoned by the government forces.

==== 5–6 July ====
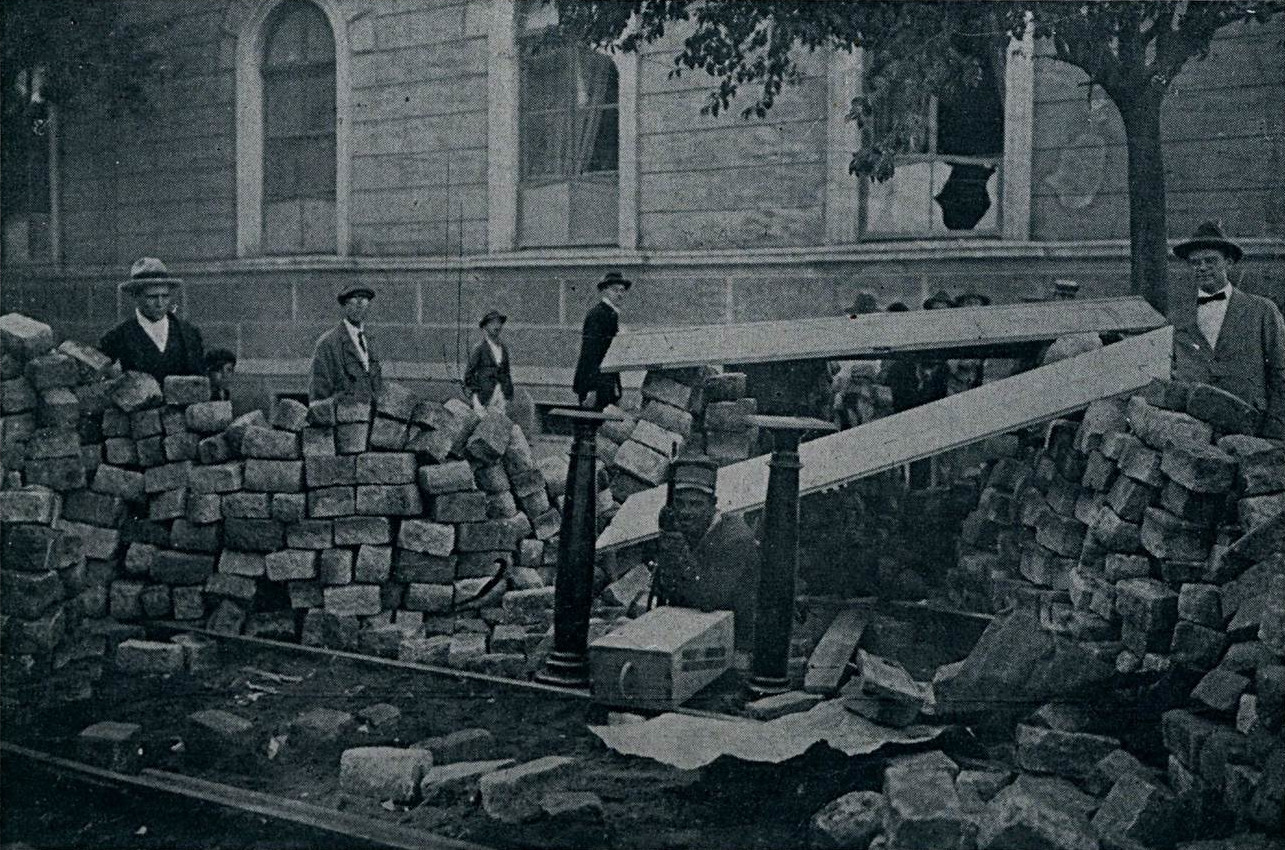
Barricades at the Campos Elíseos Palace

At 09:00 on 5 July, rebel artillery positioned on Campo de Marte opened fire on the Campos Elíseos Palace. Several shots missed, and the bombardment did not deter the governor and the defenders. Artillery fired again at 16:00, targeting the secretariats, and was also used against the barracks of the 5th BFP. On Campo de Marte, revolutionary artillery came under fire from loyalists of the 4th BC. The revolutionaries repelled an attack on Luz station at 13:00, and retook the National Telegraph Office eleven hours after its loss, but lost it definitively in a new loyalist attack at 19:00.

In the afternoon and at night, two attacks in close formation, under machine gun cover, were repelled on the Campos Elíseos Palace; the latter was simultaneous with a heavy attack on the 4th BFP. Major Marcílio Franco was reinforced by about 100 army soldiers. The attackers climbed trees and hid behind walls and posts. Santa Casa recorded 21 injuries and 5 deaths throughout the day. The fighting on Campos Elíseos continued into the early hours of the morning until it quieted down around 5:00. After dawn, the rebels entered the palaces and renewed the attack, firing from the ceilings. The focus of the rebels passed to the 4th BFP; even though heavily bombed, it did not surrender.

==== 7–8 July ====
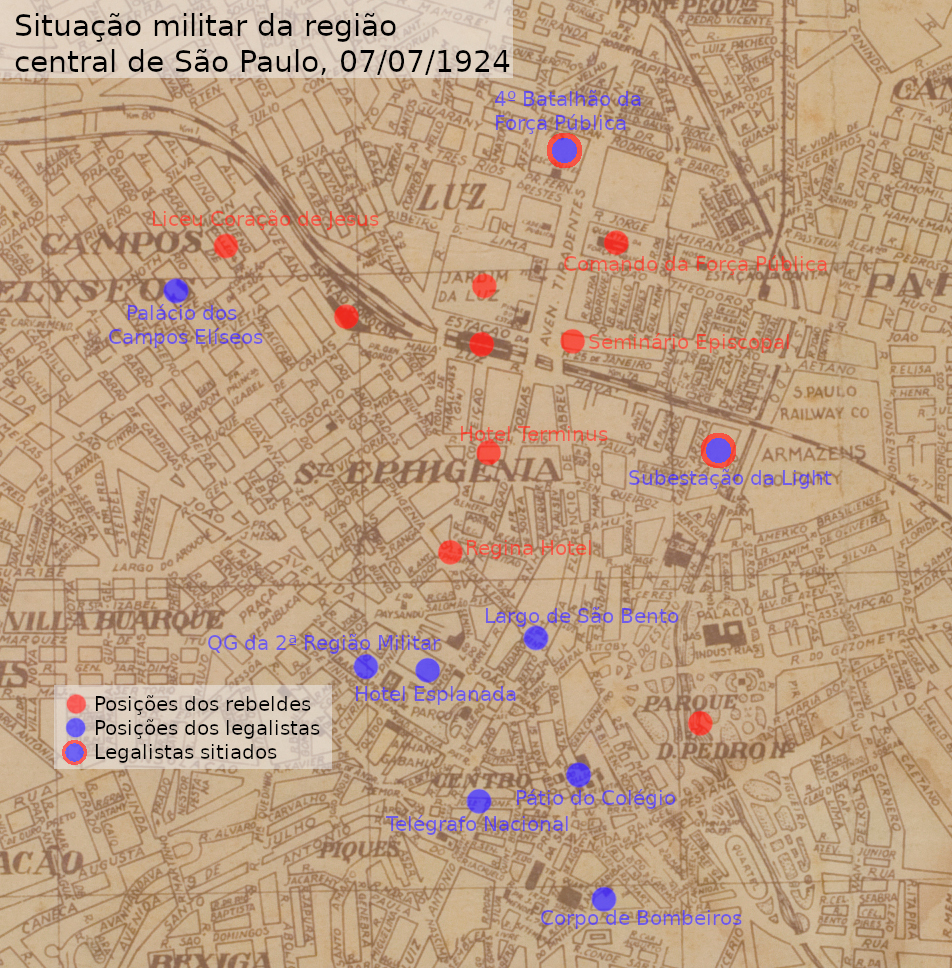
Positions in the city on 7 July

On the morning of 7 July, 70 infantrymen and loyalist firefighters came from Dom Pedro Park to attack Luz. Repulsed, they took shelter at the Light plant on Paula Souza Street, from where they threatened the southeast flank of the Luz barracks. Two revolutionary attacks were repulsed by the power plant's defenses, which had converging fire on all angles of approach. Lieutenant João Cabanas planned to open a breach in the wall with hand grenades, but his superior Miguel Costa prevented this operation, to preserve the public service of the plant. The revolutionaries contented themselves with besieging it. The loyalists at the power plant were the target of rifle fire from the Hotel Regina and the Santa Ifigênia Church, but their presence blocked the viaduct that led to São Bento square. In Campos Elíseos, on that day, the rebels captured the fire station and the Liceu Coração de Jesus, on the Barão de Piracicaba avenue, bringing them closer to the palace.

In the center, the loyalists had the Esplanada Hotel as a stronghold, close to the Municipal Theater, (Note: "Building of the current Secretary of Agriculture and Supply of the state of São Paulo, located at Ramos de Azevedo Square, No. 254" (Castro 2022, p. 54).) and the rebels, the Regina Hotel, on the Santa Ifigênia viaduct, (Note: "Currently São Paulo Inn, located on Santa Ifigênia Viaduct" (Castro 2022, p. 54).) and the Terminus Hotel, on the corner of Washington Luís Avenue and Brigadeiro Tobias Street. Revolutionaries in Dom Pedro Square, on the banks of the Tamanduateí river, fought the loyalists at the top of the hill of Pátio do Colégio; other loyalists concentrated in the Fire Department headquarters, on Anita Garibaldi Street. The neighborhoods of Brás, Pari, Belenzinho and Mooca, were occupied by the rebels since the morning; a loyalist contingent was besieged in the Normal School of Brás.

Reinforcements from Santos allowed the government to bomb the barracks of Luz, from the morning of 7 July, and respond to the artillery of the rebels, but their cannons had inferior range and in response they were bombed. On 8 July, the rebels took over the barricades on Florêncio de Abreu Street and dismantled the loyalist defenses at São Bento square.

=== Withdrawal of the state government ===
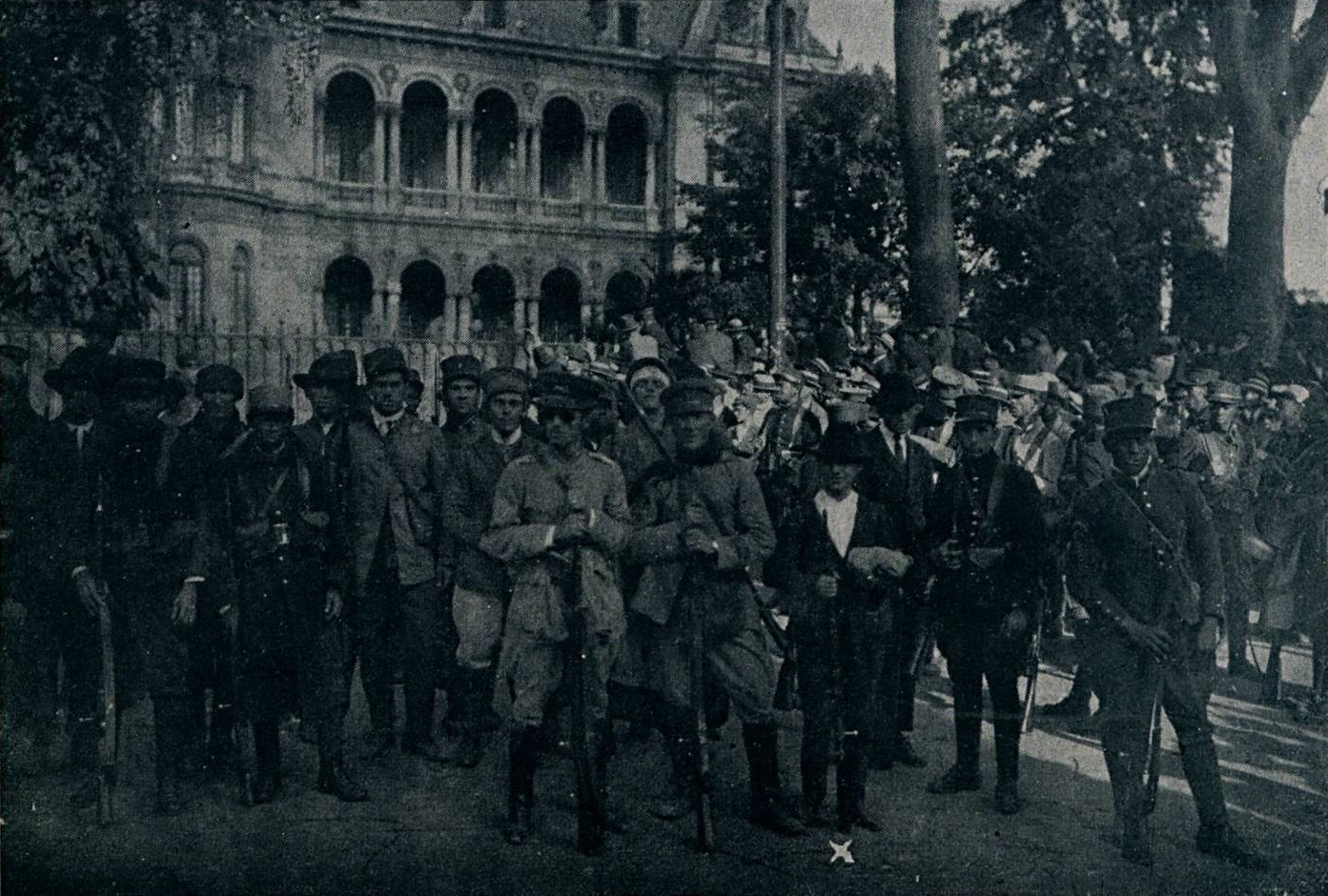
The rebels occupy the Campos Elíseos Palace, seat of the state government

On 8 July, the rebels positioned Quitaúna's heavy artillery in the Araçá cemetery and bombed Campos Elíseos again. Thanks to recent territorial advances, the bombing was more effective, to the point that generals Pamplona and Arlindo advised the governor to transfer the seat of his government to the Secretariat of Justice, in Largo do Palácio, farther from the combat. The governor left behind a contingent of the Public Force in Campos Elíseos and left at 13:00. This position was also hit at 15:30, killing several of the sailors that were guarding the area. Carlos de Campos, suspecting the presence of spies, again left his position, and followed with the two generals who accompanied him to Guaiaúna, where they would join general Eduardo Sócrates, who was bringing reinforcements from Rio de Janeiro.

A widespread loyalist withdrawal followed; the troops abandoned their positions, concentrating in more distant regions in the directions of Santos (Ipiranga) and Rio de Janeiro (Guaiaúna), from where they would prepare their offensive to reconquer the city. At night, the defenders of the Campos Elíseos Palace and the sailors left, and early the next morning, the commander of the Public Force and the defenders of the Fire Department and neighboring streets. The last redoubt in the central region was the 4th Battalion of the Public Force, which raised the white flag at the end of 9 July, (Note: Meirelles 2002, p. 106, states that the 5th BFP remained isolated, resisting after the government's withdrawal, but the report in Costa & Góis 1924, p. 51 shows that this barracks was abandoned by the loyalists.) freeing the arrested revolutionaries. The officers of that battalion were imprisoned in their own residences, while the soldiers joined the revolt.

=== Evaluation of the withdrawal ===
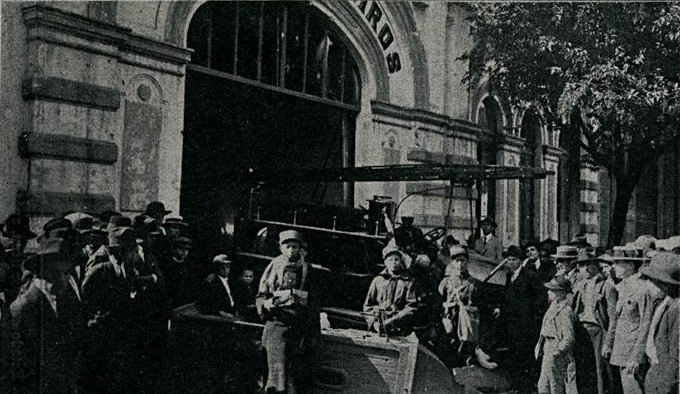
Fire Station barracks occupied by the rebels

Decades after the conflict, the withdrawal remained a controversial decision: the government troops surrendered the entire city into Isidoro's hands. Abílio de Noronha described it as the result of the inertia of the loyalist command since 5 July: "who had the freedom of action, who maneuvered, who imposed their will, who attacked, were the rebels". General Pamplona remained at the Campos Elíseos Palace the entire time and later withdrew to Guaiaúna with the governor, leaving his troops behind. For Noronha, it would have been possible to transfer the civilian government and withdraw troops from the points targeted by enemy artillery, but without retreating the loyalist military command of the city; after all, at no point did the rebels have a decisive numerical advantage.

On the contrary, recalled Noronha, on 8 July the rebels were already exhausted, planning their own withdrawal from the city. The revolutionary command was divided between Isidoro and Miguel Costa. Isidoro saw no victory on the near horizon; with the arrival of enemy reinforcements from Rio de Janeiro, the troops could desert en masse. His painful solution would be to withdraw from the city and mount a defense in Jundiaí, looking for resources in the interior. On the contrary, Miguel Costa considered the urban terrain more defensible than the open countryside, and he feared that withdrawal would end up dissolving the revolutionary army. On the afternoon of 8 July, the mood at the HQ at Luz was one of dismay. Costa was unable to prevent the order to withdraw for the morning of the following day, and wrote a surrender letter. But the next morning, there was no one to surrender to: the Campos Elíseos Palace was empty.

== Second phase (9-27 July) ==
Despite having conquered the city, the revolutionaries would no longer try to continue to the Paraíba valley; the new objective was to maintain the defensive and wait for new uprisings in other garrisons. Fighting ceased in the center of the city, but resumed with a loyalist offensive on the periphery.

In addition to conquering positions, the loyalists began a heavy artillery bombardment from 11 July, possibly as a strategy to wear down the enemy, due to lack of confidence in their own troops, or as a way to minimize their casualties in direct combat. This has been criticized as a haphazard bombardment, without correction and regulation of fire. It primarily hit non-military targets, and most of the casualties were civilians. The government was accused of carrying out a "terrorizing bombing", deliberately using the suffering of civilians to put pressure on the rebels. Historian Frank McCann speculated that the army's command set aside the modern lessons of the French Military Mission and returned to the old brutal ways of the Canudos and Contestado wars.

=== Mobilization of forces ===
==== Revolutionary army ====
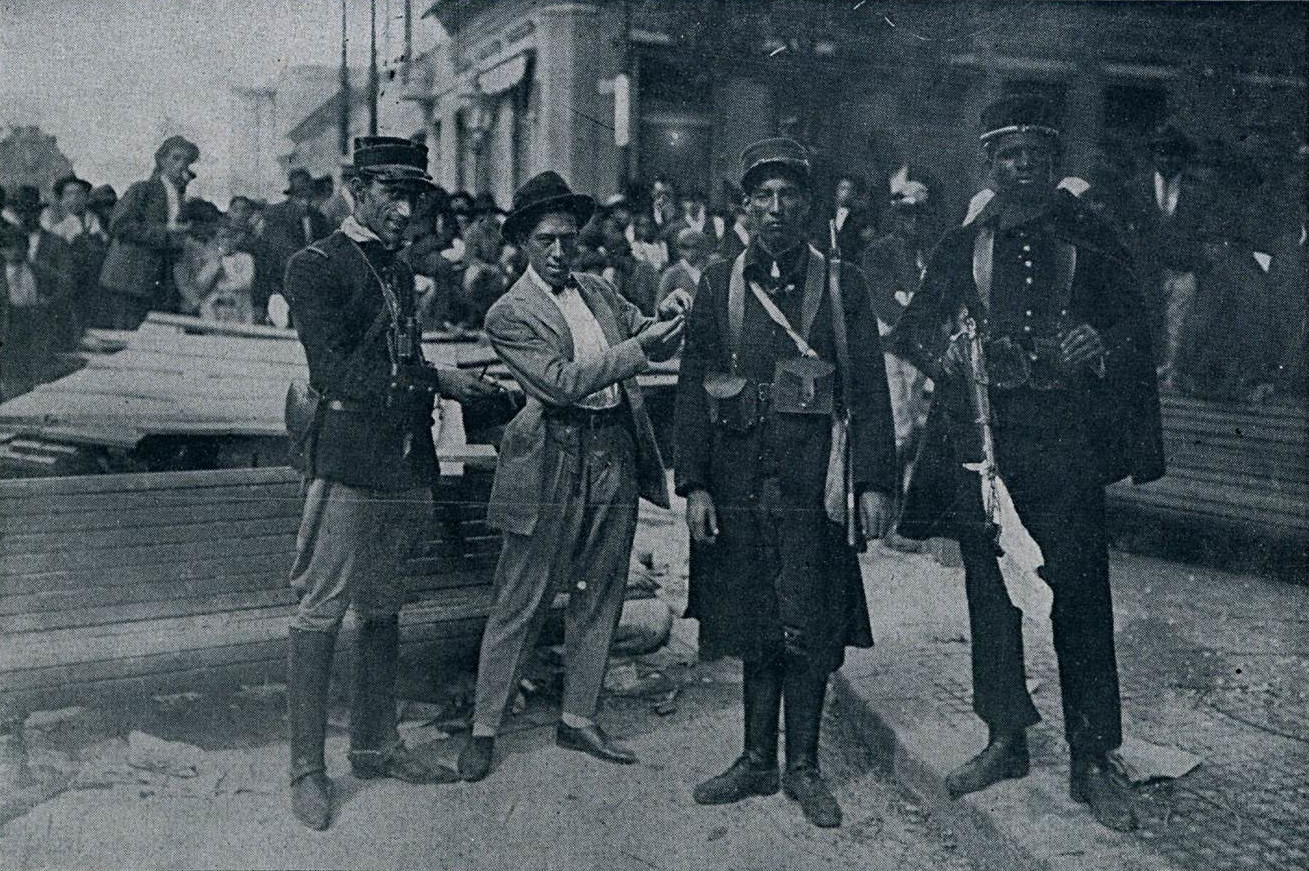
Decoration of a Public Force soldier with the chevron of corporal

Throughout July, the revolutionary army's strength in the city peaked at between 3,000 and 3,500 men, according to Abílio de Noronha's estimate. Other sources estimate 5,000, 6,000 (a number close to that calculated by the police inquiry after the revolution) or even 7,000. The 3–3,500 estimate is the one that only takes effective combatants into account. The expansion of the force took place through the incorporation of new units, the convoking of reservists and the enlistment of civilian volunteers. Soon after the withdrawal of the state government, the 4th Regiment of Mounted Artillery, from Itu, and the 5th Battalion of Caçadores, from Rio Claro, arrived in São Paulo. (Note: Even before the withdrawal of the state government of São Paulo, these two units had already joined the revolt (Meirelles 2002, p. 90). The 6th Battalion of Hunters, a unit of the 2nd Military Region headquartered in Ipameri, Goiás, arrived in Campinas on the 15th, but chose not to help the rebels and returned to its headquarters (Noronha 1924, p. 79).)

The rebels had an acute need for soldiers, to the point where they offered advance payment and land to anyone willing to fight. Notable among the volunteers were the three foreign battalions: German, Hungarian and Italian, recruited from the immigrant communities after 20 July. They numbered up to 750 combatants, including World War I veterans with valuable experience to the war effort. The rebels also planned to incorporate 200 prisoners from the state penitentiary into their ranks, but Isidoro canceled the request after protests from the director.

The rebels were forced to divert troops from the front line to policing after 9 July, when, in the power vacuum created by the withdrawal of the state government, starving people looted several commercial buildings. General Isidoro, pressured by representatives of the São Paulo economic elite, could not give up public order. The solution was to create a Municipal Guard with the help of the city hall, freeing soldiers from the task of policing.

==== Loyalist army ====
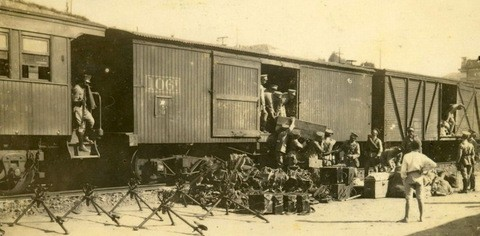
Arrival of state soldiers from Rio Grande do Sul

The large flow of loyalist reinforcements continued after the government withdrew. Along the axes of Santos and Rio de Janeiro, the loyalists gathered much of the country's combat power. By 15 July, they were able to attack with 10,000 men; in total they mustered between 14 and 15 thousand men, a numerical advantage of five to one, or up to 18,000. States' military forces were important in this build-up of force: Minas Gerais troops landed in the city on 9 July, followed by Rio de Janeiro and Espírito Santo ones on the 18th, and Rio Grande do Sul troops on the 22nd. The first Navy troops to land in the city returned to Santos after the fall of the government, but another battalion arrived on the 13th.

The units formed the Division of Operations in the State of São Paulo, under the command of general Eduardo Sócrates, divided into five brigades. The loyalist remnants of the Public Force of São Paulo, fighting in the south, formed a regiment or brigade, which became part of general Carlos Arlindo's brigade. On the 7th, the brigade of general Tito Villa Lobos, later transferred to colonel João Gomes Ribeiro, disembarked in Guaiaúna, with regiments from Minas Gerais. On the 10th, it was the turn of general Florindo Ramos's brigade, the next day, the 15th Infantry Regiment, and the next day, general Tertuliano Potiguara's, with 2,200 men. The 5th Infantry Regiment and reinforcements from outside São Paulo were gathered into colonel Pantaleão Telles's brigade.

The displacement of some battalions from the North and Northeast was impeded by new tenentist uprisings in those regions. The revolt in Sergipe interrupted the departure of the 20th, 21st, 22nd and 28th BCs, respectively from Maceió, Recife, Paraíba (now João Pessoa) and Aracaju. The 23rd, 24th, 25th and 26th BCs, respectively from São Luís, Teresina and Belém, also had their displacement to the Southeast cancelled, and new uprisings took place in Belém and Manaus.

==== Order of battle ====
Shortly after the conflict, Abílio de Noronha published the composition of the loyalist and revolutionary armies, admitting "small flaws" in the loyalist brigades. Writers Ciro Costa and Eurico de Góis reproduced the loyalist order of battle in the "official notes (...) as we obtained them from the command of the 2nd Military Region, from the headquarters of the 3rd Infantry Brigade and from the secretariat of the Public Force headquarters of the State of São Paulo". The two listings have some differences. (Note: Listings compiled based on Noronha 1924, pp. 126–131 and Costa & Góis 1924, pp. 119–130, with additional information where indicated. Savian 2020, p. 95 reproduces the list of general Noronha.)

Order of battle of the rebels in the capital
General command: general Isidoro Dias Lopes
- 4th Battalion of Caçadores (half)
- 5th Battalion of Caçadores
- 4th Infantry Regiment
- Company of the 5th Infantry Regiment
- 6th Infantry Regiment
- 1st Battalion of the Public Force of São Paulo
- 2nd Battalion of the Public Force of São Paulo
- 105 mm battery of the 2nd Heavy Artillery Group 105 mm battery
- Battery and section of the 2nd Mounted Artillery Group
- Two batteries of the 4th Mounted Artillery Regiment
- Cavalry Regiment of the Public Force of São Paulo
- School Corps of the Public Force of São Paulo (almost entirely)
- Other contingents of the Public Force of São Paulo
- Foreign volunteers
  - German battalion
  - Hungarian battalion
  - Italian battalion

Loyalist order of battle in the capital at the end of July
Division of Operations in the State of São Paulo (Divisional General Eduardo Sócrates)
Colonel João Gomes Ribeiro Brigade
- 15th Independent Cavalry Regiment (Colonel Feliciano Pinto Pessoa)
- 10th Infantry Regiment (Note: Originally belonging to the Telles brigade, later transferred to João Gomes Ribeiro (Costa & Góis 1924, p. 126.) (Colonel Manuel de Andrade Melo)
- 8th Infantry Regiment (Colonel Enéas Pompílio Pires)
- Company of the Public Force (Note: "The author does not specify from which state the company of the Public Force that made up the Brigade by Colonel João G. Ribeiro was, it was probably from São Paulo" (Savian 2020, p. 95).)
- 3rd Battery of the 9th Mounted Artillery Regiment (Captain Reis Júnior)

Colonel Pantaleão Telles Brigade

- 5th Infantry Regiment (minus one company) (Colonel Leandro José da Costa)
- 11th Infantry Regiment (Colonel Adolfo Massa)
- 15th Battalion of Caçadores (Colonel Napoleão Poeta da Fontoura)
- Divisional artillery support elements

General Florindo Ramos Brigade

- 10th Battalion of Caçadores (Major Corbiniano Cardoso)
- 12th Infantry Regiment (Colonel Diógenes Monteiro Tourinho)
- 6th Provisional Battalion of the Public Force of Minas Gerais (Note: Unit made up of 12 officers, 43 sergeants, 97 graduates and 300 soldiers (Andrade 1976, pp. 58–59).) (Major Henrique Brandão)
- 1st Battalion of the Military Brigade of Rio Grande do Sul (Lieutenant colonel João de Deus Canabarro Cunha) (Note: Noronha 1924 only mentions the Rio Grande do Sul contingent within the Potiguara brigade. Costa & Góis 1924 identifies the 1st Battalion in the Florindo brigade and a group of Battalions of Caçadores, without specifying its brigade. Ribeiro 1953, who is a source from the Military Brigade, clarifies from page 224: the group had two Battalions of Caçadores (the second, commanded by lieutenant colonel Artur Otaviano Travassos Alves) and a Company of Heavy Machine Guns (commanded by captain Alzimiro Francisco Wellausen). The Rio Grande do Sul troops were assigned to the Potiguara brigade, but the 1st Battalion was made available to the Florindo brigade after the 23rd (p. 230).)
- Divisional artillery support elements

General Tertuliano Potiguara Brigade

- 1st Infantry Regiment (Colonel Odorico Henriques)
- 2nd Infantry Regiment (José Luís Pereira de Vasconcellos)
- Part of the 4th Battalion of Caçadores (Captain Antônio de Paiva Sampaio)
- 1st Heavy Machine Gun Company (Note: Omitted by Costa & Góis 1924.)
- Group of Battalions of Caçadores of the Military Brigade of Rio Grande do Sul (Lieutenant colonel Emílio Lúcio Esteves)
- Divisional artillery support elements

General Carlos Arlindo Brigade

- 7th Battalion of Caçadores (Colonel Francelino Albuquerque)
- 8th Battalion of Caçadores (Colonel Atalíbio Taurino Resende)
- 13th Battalion of Caçadores (Colonel Otávio Valgas Neves) (Note: Originally commanded by colonel José Maria Andrade Santiago until his death in combat (Costa & Góis 1924, p. 129).)
- 19th Battalion of Caçadores (Colonel Oscar Gualberto Dias Moura)
- 9th Heavy Machine Gun Company (Captain Tomé Rodrigues)
- 1st Horse Artillery Group (Lieutenant colonel Bento Marinho Alves) (Note: Omitted by Noronha 1924.)
- Battery of the 3rd Coastal Artillery Group
- Navy Troops (Corvette captain Clodoveu Celestino Gomes) (Note: 833 sailors (Mendonça 1997, p. 105).)
- Regiment of the Public Force of São Paulo (Lieutenant colonel Pedro Dias)
  - 1st War Battalion (Lieutenant colonel Joviniano Brandão)
  - 2nd War Battalion (Lieutenant colonel Afro Marcondes de Rezende)
  - 3rd War Battalion (Lieutenant colonel José Sandoval de Figueiredo)
- 1st Battalion of the Public Force of Rio de Janeiro (Major Luís Antunes Viana)
- 2nd Battalion of the Public Force of Rio de Janeiro (Eurico Peixoto)
- Contingent of the Public Force of Espírito Santo (Note: 321 men (Martins 1992, p. 283).) (Lieutenant colonel Abílio Martins)

Divisional troops:

- Artillery brigade (General João José de Lima) (Note: Omitted by Noronha 1924.)
  - 155 mm battery and 105 mm battery of the 1st Heavy Artillery Group (Note: Presence of the 2nd Battery, with 155 mm guns, attested by Parreira 2019, p. 20. Costa & Góis 1924, p. 127 ignore this group in the list, but mention a "heavy group", commanded by lieutenant colonel Garcez and consisting of a 105 mm battery, by captain Luiz Gonzaga Fernandes, and a 155 mm one by Captain Luiz Correia Lima.)
  - 8th Mounted Artillery Regiment (Note: Omitted by Noronha 1924.) (Colonel Crisanto Leite de Miranda Sá Júnior)
  - 6.º Regimento de Artilharia Montada (Note: Costa & Góis 1924 only mention the 9th Battery of this regiment, including it in the Arlindo brigade, under the command of captain Pedro Duro.)
  - 5th Mountain Artillery Group (Note: Costa & Góis 1924 omit this group from the list, but mention a "mountain group of 75mm", with two batteries commanded by captains Antônio Fernandes Leal and Jorge Antônio Sounis. The presence of Antônio Fernandes Leal in this group is attested in the press in March 1924.)
  - 2nd Heavy Artillery Regiment (Lieutenant colonel Alfredo Assunção) (Note: According to Catálogo de destino dos acervos das Organizações Militares do Exército Brasileiro, p. 108, this unit, based in Jundiaí, had become the 2nd GIAP on 8 March 1924. The 2nd GIAP participated in the revolt, but with only one battery; other rebel units participated only in part, while other parts were in the loyalist contingent, such as the 4th Battalion of Caçadores (Noronha 1924, pp. 126, 129). The presence of Lieutenant Colonel Alfredo Assunção in this unit is attested in the press in February 1924.)
  - 2nd Group of the 1st Mounted Artillery Regiment (Major Mascarenhas de Morais) (Note: Omitted by Noronha 1924. Presence attested in the entry of Dicionário Histórico-Biográfico Brasileiro about the commander.)
  - Battery of the 3rd Independent Heavy Artillery Group (Captain Argemiro Dornellas) (Note: Included by Noronha 1924 within the Arlindo brigade.)
- 2nd Divisional Cavalry Regiment (Major Adalberto Dinis)
- 4th Divisional Cavalry Regiment (Colonel João Baptista Pires de Almada)
- 1st Engineer Battalion (Note: Costa & Góis 1924 mention only one Company of Minas Gerais sappers from that battalion.)
- 4th Engineer Battalion (Colonel Gustavo Leboro Regis)
- Assault Car Company (Captain Newton de Andrade Cavalcanti)
- Transmission Company
- Army aviation contingent
  - Improvement Squadron
  - First Aviation Park Company
- Navy Aviation Squadron

=== Roads to the interior of the state ===
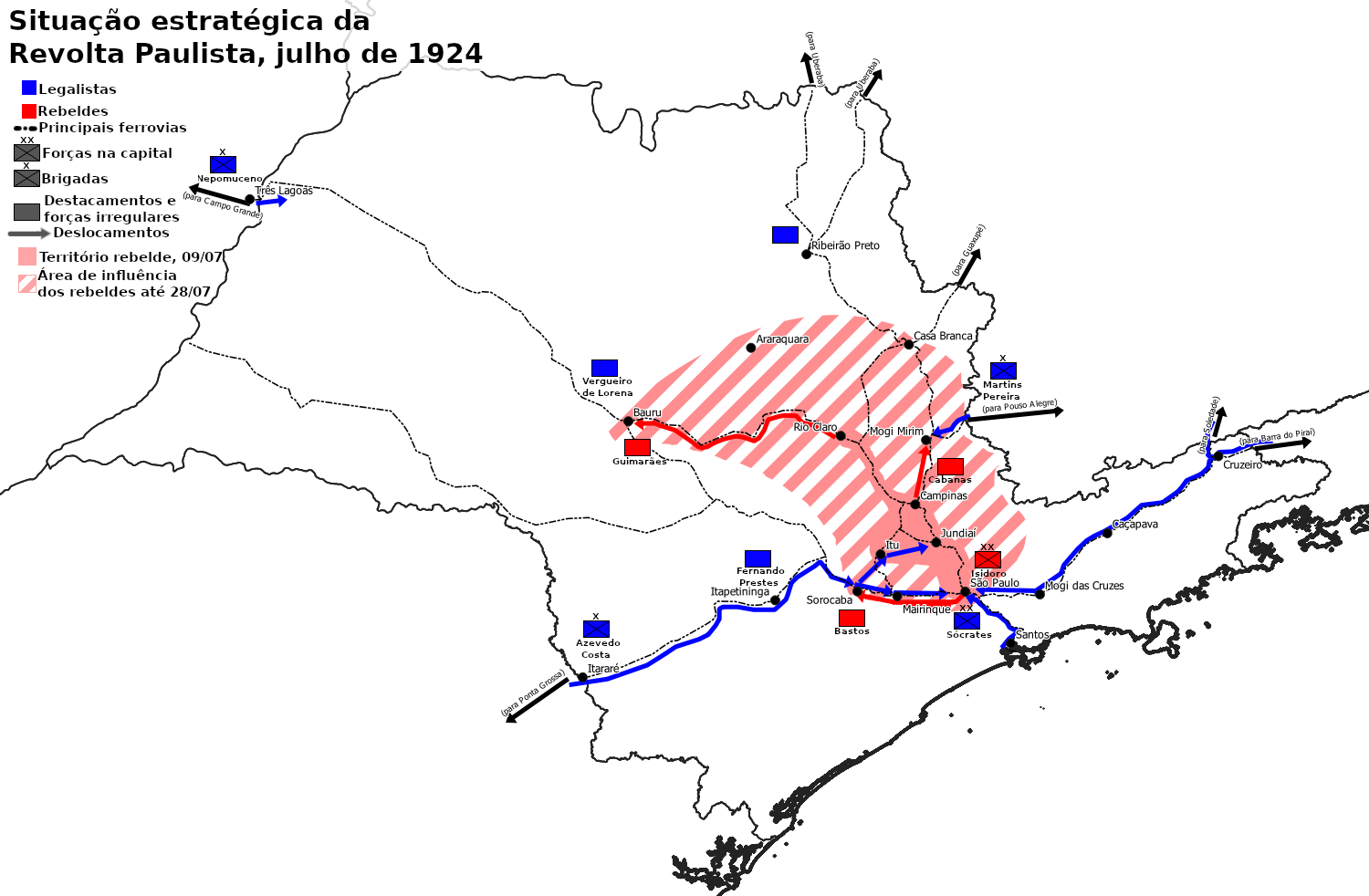
Railway control in the interior of São Paulo

The routes from São Paulo to Santos and Rio de Janeiro, respectively by the São Paulo and the Central do Brasil Railways, came under loyalist control. This did not mean a well-executed siege, as the revolutionaries had several roads open to the interior; by 9 July they already controlled Itu, Jundiaí, Campinas, and Rio Claro, and over the course of the month they expanded their control as far as Bauru and Araraquara. The loyalists also acted in the interior: while general Sócrates' division occupied the capital of São Paulo, other columns would come from Mato Grosso, Minas Gerais and Paraná to besiege São Paulo. But only on the Paraná axis, coming from Sorocaba, were they successful, winning battles in Pantojo and Mairinque, on 26 July. This was too late, as the fighting in the capital had already ended, and the rebels had continued to Bauru the day before.

=== Frontlines on the periphery ===
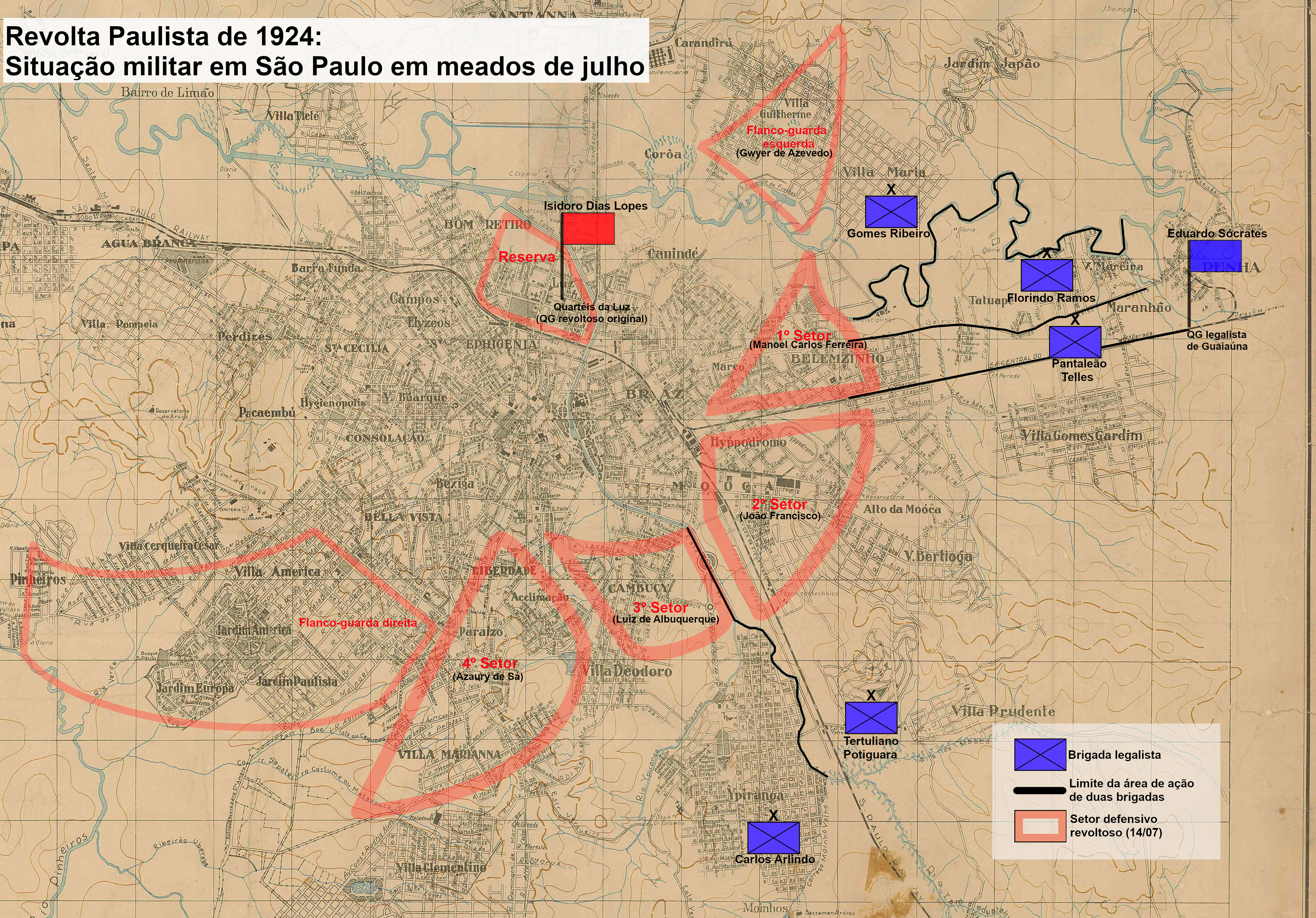
Loyalist brigades and revolutionary defensive sectors

In order to retake the city, the Division of Operations distributed its brigades in a semi circle around the Tietê river, to the south and east of the city. The concentration was especially strong on the way to Rio de Janeiro, in Central do Brasil, where the division's command post and two brigades were located. Loyalists dominated the topography around the city, such as the Mooca, Penha, and Ipiranga elevations. A belt of working-class neighborhoods separated their positions from the center.

Colonel João Gomes Ribeiro's brigade was in Vila Maria, advancing towards Santana; that of general Florindo Ramos, between Tietê and Celso Garcia Avenue, in the direction of Belenzinho and Brás; that of colonel Pantaleão Telles, between the tracks of the Central do Brasil station and Celso Garcia Avenue, also heading to Belenzinho; that of general Tertuliano Potiguara, between the tracks of the Central do Brasil and the Tamanduateí canal, against Mooca, following the São Paulo Railway; and general Carlos Arlindo, with the right flank on the Tamanduateí channel, in the direction of Vila Mariana and Ipiranga.

The revolutionaries were divided into four sectors and two flankguards. Around 14 July, captain Gwyer de Azevedo's left flank-guard was at Vila Guilherme; the first sector, by lieutenant Manoel Carlos Ferreira, ran from Belenzinho to Vila Guilherme, between the bridge over the Tietê river and the Hipódromo da Mooca; the second sector, belonging to colonel João Francisco, reached Brás and Mooca, between Hipódromo and Várzea do Carmo; the third sector, belonging to captain Luiz de Albuquerque, was in Cambuci; the fourth sector, belonging to lieutenant Azaury de Sá Brito e Souza, was in Liberdade, Paraíso, Aclimação and Vila Mariana; and the right flank-guard, under direct command from the headquarters, ran from the Paulista Avenue to Pinheiros, also covering Jardim Europa and Jardim América.

=== First loyalist offensive ===
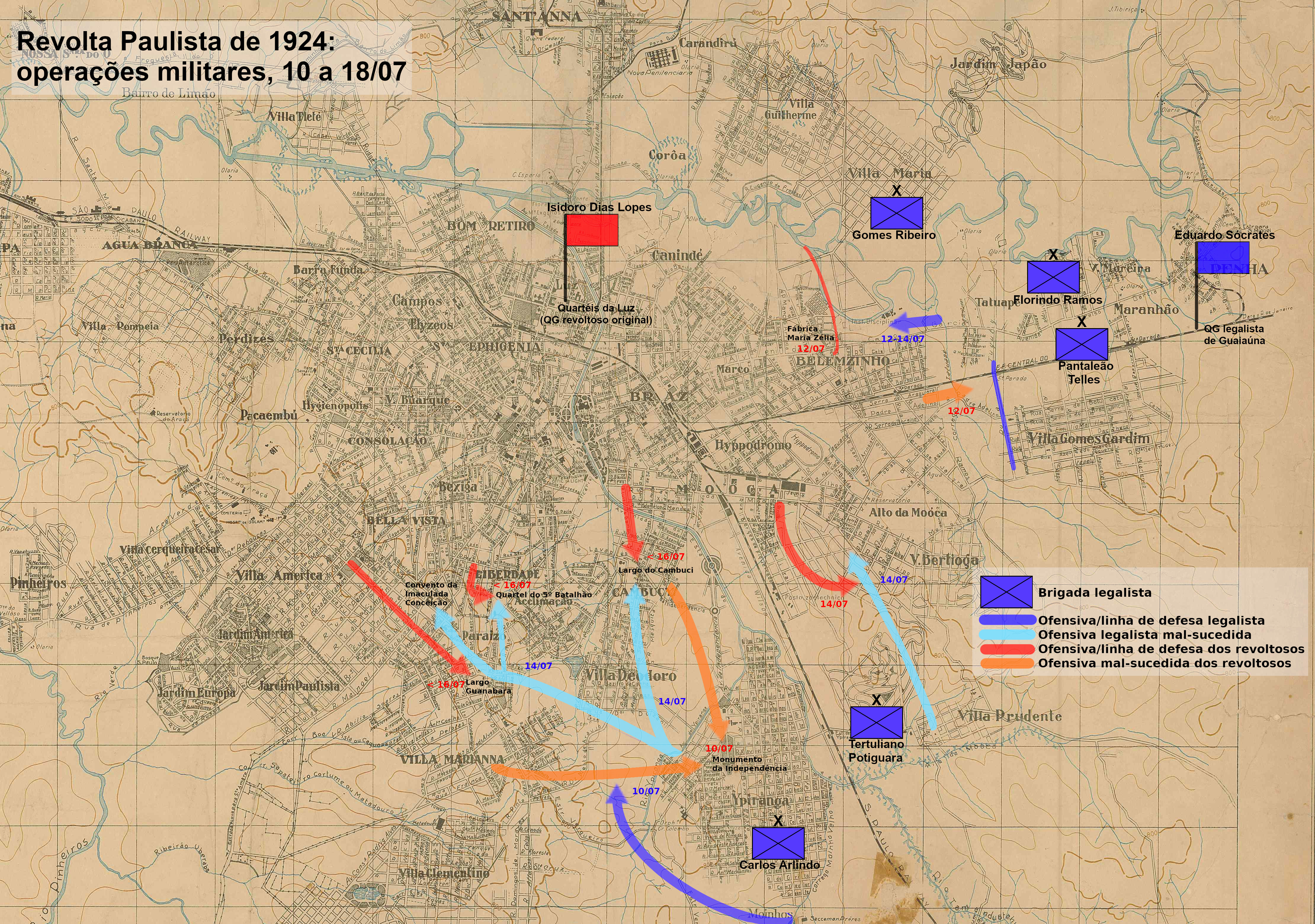
First offensives and counteroffensives on the outskirts of the city

The Arlindo Ramos brigade had the right flank secured by the Potiguara brigade, but on 10 July its left flank was vulnerable to an attack by the insurgents coming from Cambuci and Vila Mariana. About 200 revolutionaries led by Gwyer de Azevedo acted in Ipiranga, taking the redoubt behind the Ipiranga Museum to surprise a larger loyalist force from above. From there they attacked with machine guns, but they were silenced by Navy artillery. Loyalists from the 1st BFP attacked Vila Seckler, bypassed the museum, and captured the revolutionary forward defenses. After sustaining fire all afternoon, Gwyer de Azevedo withdrew. (Note: Costa & Góis 1924 describes a battle in an open field in the region of Ipiranga and Sacomã, with about a thousand attacking revolutionaries, resulting in 36 casualties among the loyalists and more than a hundred among the revolutionaries, and mentions the burial of the dead behind the Ipiranga Museum on the 10th.)

Further north, in Central do Brasil, the loyalists repelled attacks at the 5th Train Stop. (Note: Costa & Góis 1924, pp. 206–207, and Andrade 1976, pp. 63–64. On the 11th, the 6th Minas Gerais Battalion was between the 5th Train Stop and the chapel on Serra de Bragança Street, where it repelled an offensive on the night of 12 to 13 July.) On 10 July, the loyalists dislodged the 6th RI from their positions at the Maria Zélia Factory, in Belenzinho. In response, at dawn the following day, lieutenant João Cabanas slipped with his force along the banks of the Tietê. Attacked by the Florindo Ramos brigade, he had to retreat, but managed to reoccupy the factory and secure the defense line from Celso Garcia Avenue to the Vila Maria bridge. From the top of this privileged position, the revolutionaries looked down on the Disciplinary Institute, awaiting its occupation by the loyalists, which was completed by the Telles brigade around 12th–14 July. (Note: Castro 2022, p. 59, mentions capture after writing about 14 July; Costa & Góis 1924, before writing of the 13th.) Cabanas repelled several attacks on the factory, but the situation was critical. He called in artillery support on the 12th, but all the shots missed and hit the revolutionaries themselves. On the 14th, the point of connection between the Telles and Potiguara brigades was on the banks of the Tatuapé stream. (Note: Minas Gerais troops were on the hill beyond the Belenzinho cemetery.(Andrade 1976, p. 65).)

=== Revolutionary counter-offensives ===
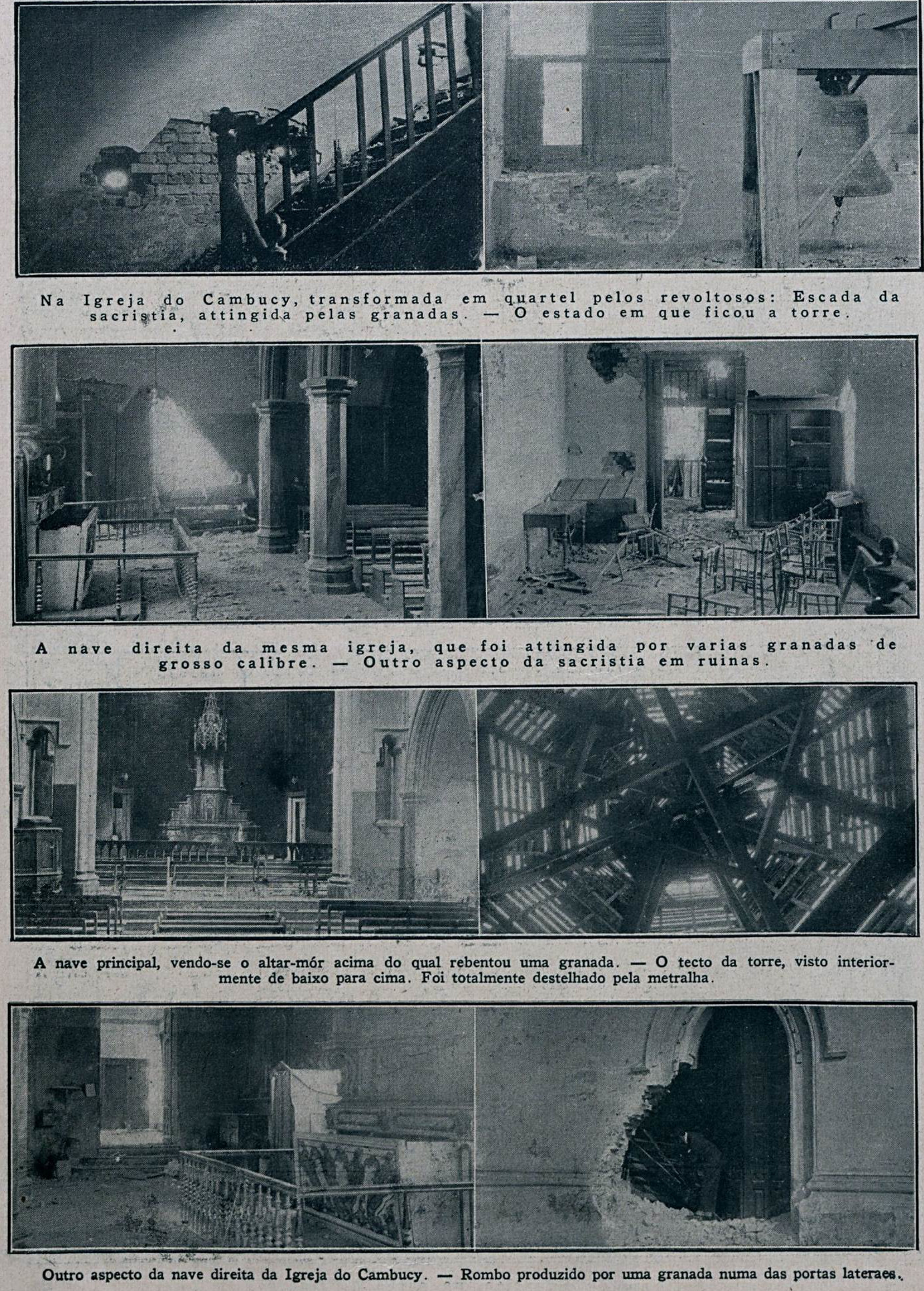
Internal damage to the Cambuci church, conquered several times during the conflict

The Potiguara brigade advanced from 12 to 13 July, allowing the Arlindo Ramos brigade to capture Largo do Cambuci. On the night of 14 July, this column passed through Aclimação and Vila Mariana and occupied positions as far as Liberdade, such as the barracks of the 5th Battalion of the Public Force, on Vergueiro Street, and the Convent of the Imaculada Conceição, on Brigadeiro Luís Antônio Avenue. However, that same day, the Potiguara brigade suffered a serious setback when it advanced too far with unguarded flanks, retreating by a kilometer after being attacked by captain Newton Estillac Leal.

As a result of this retreat, the Arlindo brigate, on the left, and the Telles, on the right, had their flanks exposed and received revolutionary offensives. Colonel Telles was ordered to retreat, but he allocated forces to defend his flank and by 17 July he had managed to defend his positions. The Arlindo brigade lost its newly conquered positions. The loyalists attacked across the front on the 15th to 16th, making advances. On the night of 15 July, they were repelled in Mooca near Mooca and Oratório streets.

Until 16 July, the rebels retook Largo do Cambuci, coming from Mooca along Luís Gama Street; they surrounded and forced the surrender of the 5th Battalion barracks, in a violent attack coming from Maestro Cardim Street; and they caught up with the rear guard of the loyalists, entrenched in Largo Guanabara and Vergueiro Street, with another attack along Alameda Santos. The Arlindo brigade suffered heavy casualties and panic began, as its communications with the barracks in São Caetano were cut off. The revolutionary victory came at a high cost: the death of captain Joaquim Távora from wounds received in the attack on the 5th Battalion.

=== Conquest of the redoubts ===
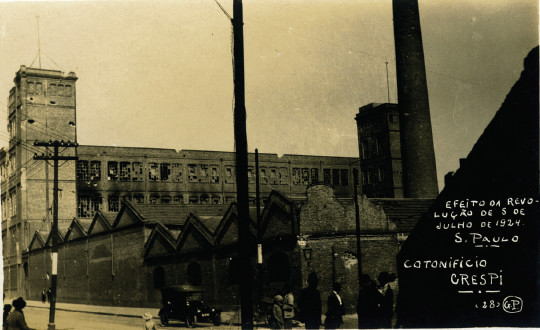
Cotonifício Crespi, bombed during the loyalist offensive

The Florindo and Potiguara brigades advanced on 19 July, reaching the 4th Train Stop of the Central do Brasil Railway. (Note: Costa & Góis 1924, p. 207. On the 22nd, the 6th Minas Gerais Battalion went to the intersection of the Tobias Barreto and Padre Adelino streets, close to the 4th Train Stop (Andrade 1976, pp. 65–66).) In Mooca, the stronghold of the Antarctica beer factory prevented the loyalist advance. The capture of this position by Navy troops on 23 July required three days of firefight, culminating in an artillery bombardment and final melee combat. The plume of smoke was visible from miles away.

In its difficult progression to the center of the city, the Arlindo brigade encountered greater resistance in Largo do Cambuci, defended by lieutenant Ari Fonseca Cruz. At this stronghold, machine guns were positioned in the tower and nave of the Glória church, while trenches cut the street. An army infantry battalion was stopped by machine guns and, to support it, the Marine battalion positioned itself on the surrounding heights. The rebels launched night counterattacks and artillery bombardments. The loyalist offensive was slow, requiring cooperation with the artillery, but it had numerical superiority. The 45 defenders present on 21 July were reduced to 12 healthy men and four wounded on the morning of the 23rd. The commander himself was wounded and woke up at night to find himself a prisoner of the enemy, who had already occupied Largo do Cambuci.

On the same day, the 19th BC attacked Vila Mariana, but was almost surrounded. This discouraged further advances by the Arlindo brigade. In this neighborhood, the streets around the Anglo-Americano Gym were "strewn with corpses", in the words of Juarez Távora.

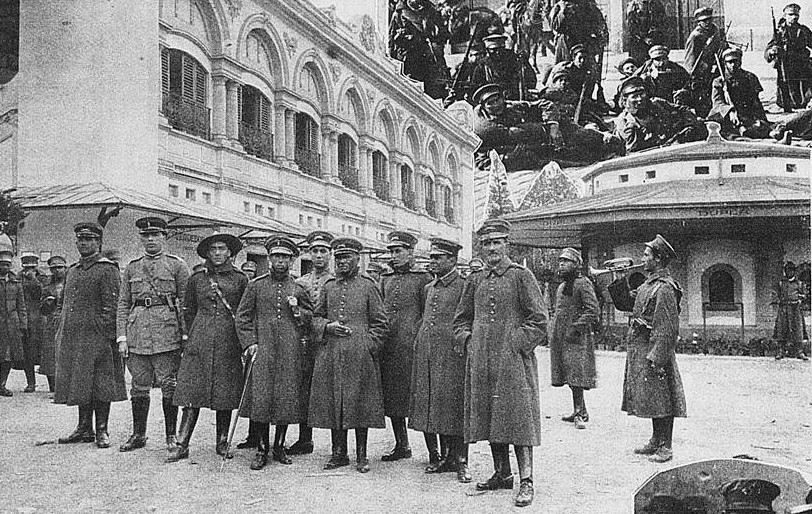
Loyalist officers after the occupation of the Hipódromo da Mooca

The loyalists renewed their general offensive at 14:00 on 25 July. On that day, state troops from Rio Grande do Sul approached Cotonifício Crespi, (Note: Ribeiro 1953, pp. 230–232. On the 23rd, Rio Grande do Sul troops were already on Juvenal Parada Street and part of Marcial Street.) whose conquest was the great legalist victory. Machine guns from the top of that factory dominated the height of Mooca. The loyalists took the Hipódromo da Mooca, a heavily entrenched position, on 26 July and, the following day, the warehouse of the Central do Brasil Railway. Positioned on Bresser Street, they were already preparing to take the next stronghold, the North Station. The second revolutionary sector retreated, as did the third, which, after losing positions in Várzea do Carmo, concentrated on Apeninos, Tamandaré and Glicério streets, in Liberdade.

The only mounted patrol carried out by the loyalists, according to Abílio de Noronha, was organized by the Arlindo brigade on 26 July, when infantrymen from Rio Grande do Sul, with requisitioned animals, passed by the left flank of the rebels, towards Jardim América.

== Withdrawal of the rebels ==
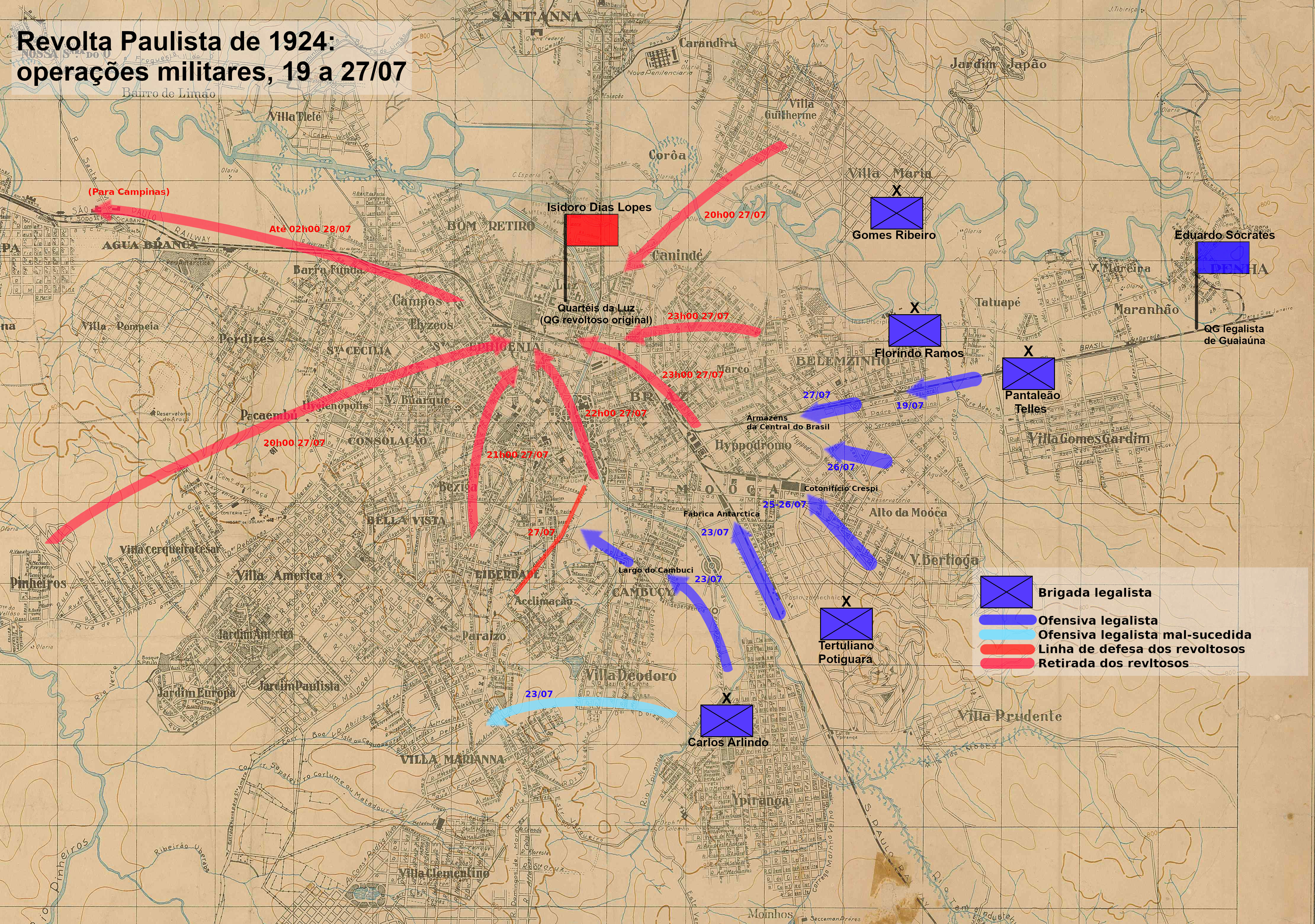
Loyalist offensives of 19 July to the retreat of the rebels

On 27 July it would still be possible to fight for ten to fifteen days, in Isidoro's estimation. Glauco Carneiro cited "expert calculations" according to which the rebels would take another ten days to be forcibly expelled from the city. The withdrawal of the revolutionaries from the capital, heading inland on the night of the 27th, left these considerations as hypotheses. The reasons for this decision were several: the defeats in the direction of Sorocaba, from where a loyalist column was about to cut the road to Campinas, and the futility of prolonging the destruction of the city in a struggle without prospects of victory. Inland, heading towards Mato Grosso, the revolutionary command still believed it had a future.

The shipment of material at Luz stations began at 14:00 on 27 July, without the knowledge of the advanced combatants. Small detachments commanded by Manoel Pires, Nélson de Melo and Ricardo Hall provided cover, and two cannons continued to fire to confuse the loyalists, until they were left behind when the last train departed. The troops embarked at night: at 20:00, the left flank (from Guarulhos to Vila Guilherme) and the mobile guard on the right flank (Casa Branca to Pinheiros), at 21:00 the fighters of Liberdade, at 22:00 those from Cambuci and at 23:00 those of Mooca and Belenzinho. Due to departure delays, the last train departed at 2:00, two hours later than planned. The withdrawal was almost perfect: the revolutionaries took from 3,500 to 6,000 men and abundant artillery and supplies. Only a few combatants from the southern detachment failed to board in time, and very little material was left behind. Sixteen trains left for Campinas, with "an endless line of wagons" full of men and war material.

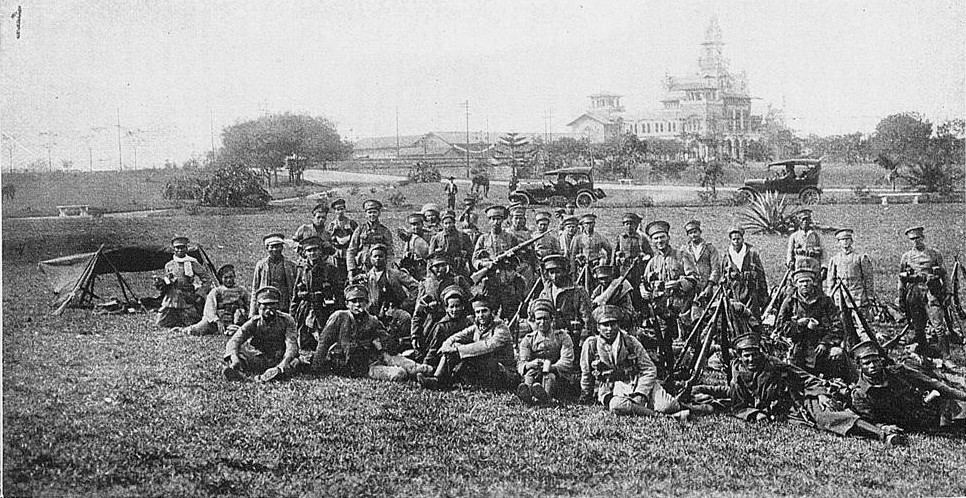
Reoccupation of the city by the loyalists

The withdrawal was very discreet. With no night patrols or contact with enemy infantry, the loyalist command did not notice the evacuation until the next morning, when soldiers found only straw dolls dressed in uniform in the revolutionary trenches. General Socrates' division had failed to lock the rebels in the capital, "letting them all slip through his fingers". This military feat is notorious, as withdrawals are risky operations. The government claimed to have imposed "unbearable and omnipresent" pressure on the rebels, but according to Abílio de Noronha, if such pressure existed, boarding would have been impossible. Glauco Carneiro called this peaceful retreat "one of the riddles of the revolution".

== Military analysis ==
In 1924, what has been called the greatest urban battle in the history of Brazil and Latin America took place, whose scenes can be compared to the scenarios of the First World War. Street fighting and artillery bombardment were extremely violent.

After the conflict, the Minister of War praised the performance of the troops: "a level of education that honors our professional dedication". On the other hand, general Noronha made severe criticisms in his books Narrando a Verdade and O Resto da Verdade. The tone of these publications was defensive, as he was accused of neglecting the conspiracy of his subordinates. His criticisms of the government withdrawal on 8 July were especially controversial; in the Chamber of Deputies, Júlio Prestes accused him of having written "a prisoner's statement, whose information was supplied by the rebels; his book is nothing more than the impressions of rebels through his style and his temperament". Noronha's writings were not limited to this, as he also quoted documents and testimonies.

=== Terrain use ===
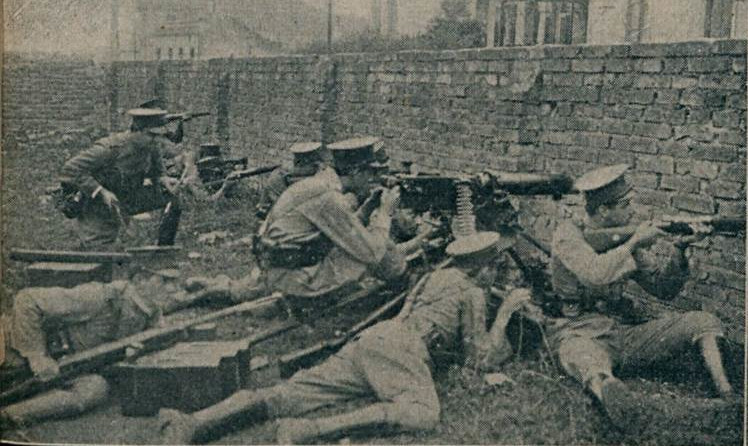
Loyalist machine gun position in Vila Mariana

The fighters moved through floodplains, avenues and narrow streets. The elevations on the periphery were observation points, as were the towers, roofs and chimneys within the city; factories were especially targeted for this purpose. Trenches became a regular feature of the landscape. The rebels had no fixed point for their artillery and infantry, moving them at night. Their machine guns were rarely visible to the public. The engagements were only with portions of the troops, never with the bulk of them.

According to Eduardo Sócrates, the rebels had defensive positions that were difficult to conquer: "it was a stronghold of streets with large buildings that, even destroyed, would offer room for defense, organized in the rubble". Abílio de Noronha argued just the opposite: "the rebels did not have a continuous line of fortifications and their trenches were very weak — a few piled up parallelepipeds and generally guarded by a small number of men". "They didn't have accessory defenses, they didn't have paradors, shrapnel guards, etc. — they were obstacles that workers, on strike days, usually build against police action".

For Noronha, these barricades would be vulnerable to close-range assault, culminating in hand-to-hand combat at bayonet point, but instead, there were no actual infantry attacks, just ineffective ranged firing, wasting thousands of rounds. There was no contact with the rebels; "it was known that they were on this or that street, because shots were coming from that point". In accounts of loyalist fighters, there are some mentions of hand-to-hand combat.

=== Distribution of forces ===
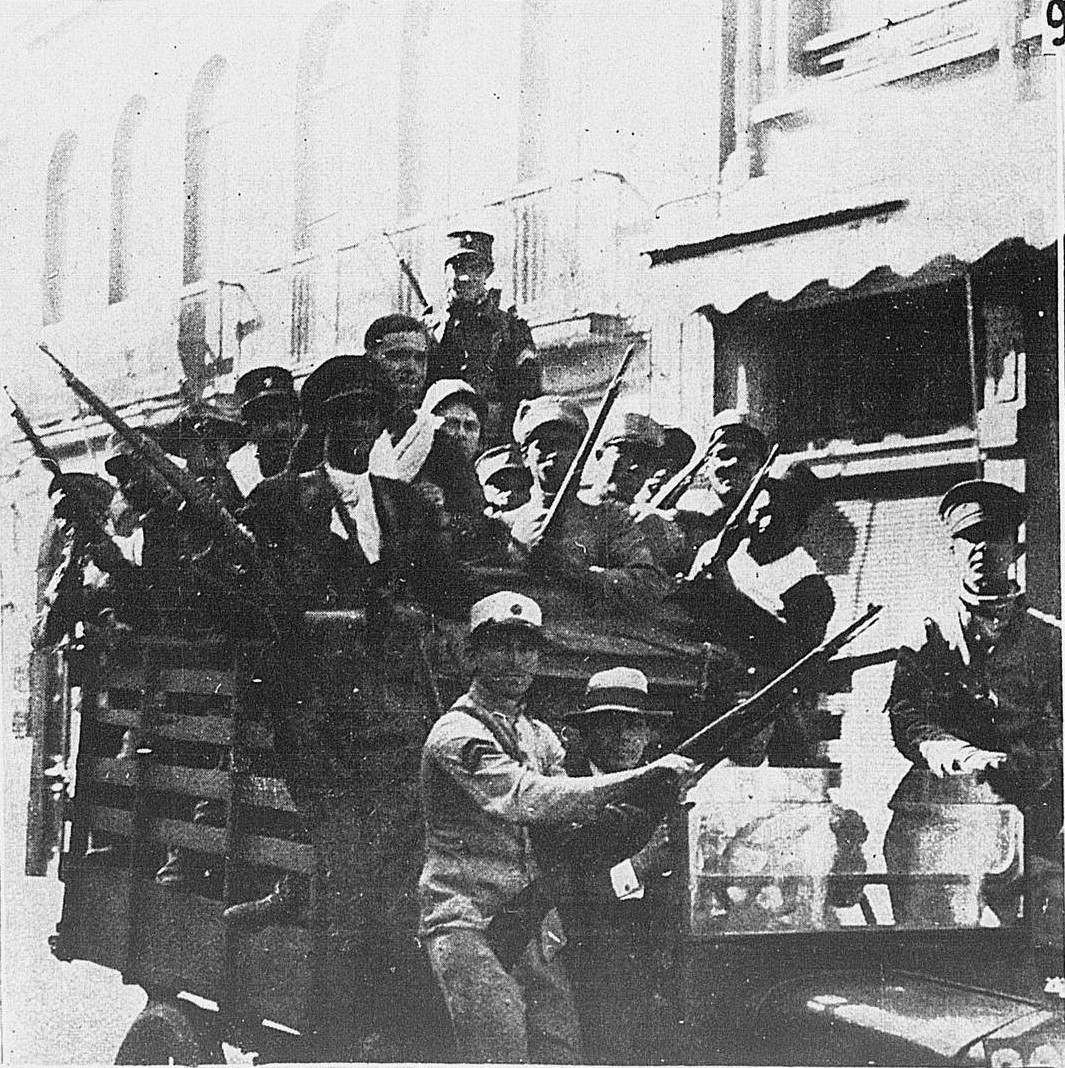
Motorized movement of the rebels

According to Abílio de Noronha, the brigades attacked in an uncoordinated way, without centralized planning. In this way, they did not take advantage of their numerical and material advantage, as the revolutionaries maintained, mainly in Luz, a large reserve, which they could transport in trucks to the attacked sectors, obtaining local superiority. The loyalist detachments left their flanks exposed to maneuvers by the Cavalry Regiment of the Public Force. Thus, the entire campaign was a "sterile effort at a caricature of the European front".

Officially, the Division of Operations conducted an overwhelming manoeuvre, in which its left flank would overcome the enemy's right flank. However, general Noronha noted the absence of flanking movements from the north (Guarulhos to the Tietê River) or south (Santo Amaro, Jardim América and Lapa). Cavalry, which would have been very useful in this manoeuvre, were left as barracks guards.

The bloodiest battles were in the east, especially in Mooca, where the most aggressive brigade was active, commanded by general Tertuliano Potiguara. This commander was a veteran of the First World War. However, lieutenant João Cabanas, who fought against the Potiguara forces in Mooca, described this offensive as one of "little military technique": "the attack, advancing in a compact mass of infantry regiments and hurling them against the well entrenched, protected and hidden enemy, was an imitation of the German attacks on Verdun".

== Equipment and technology ==
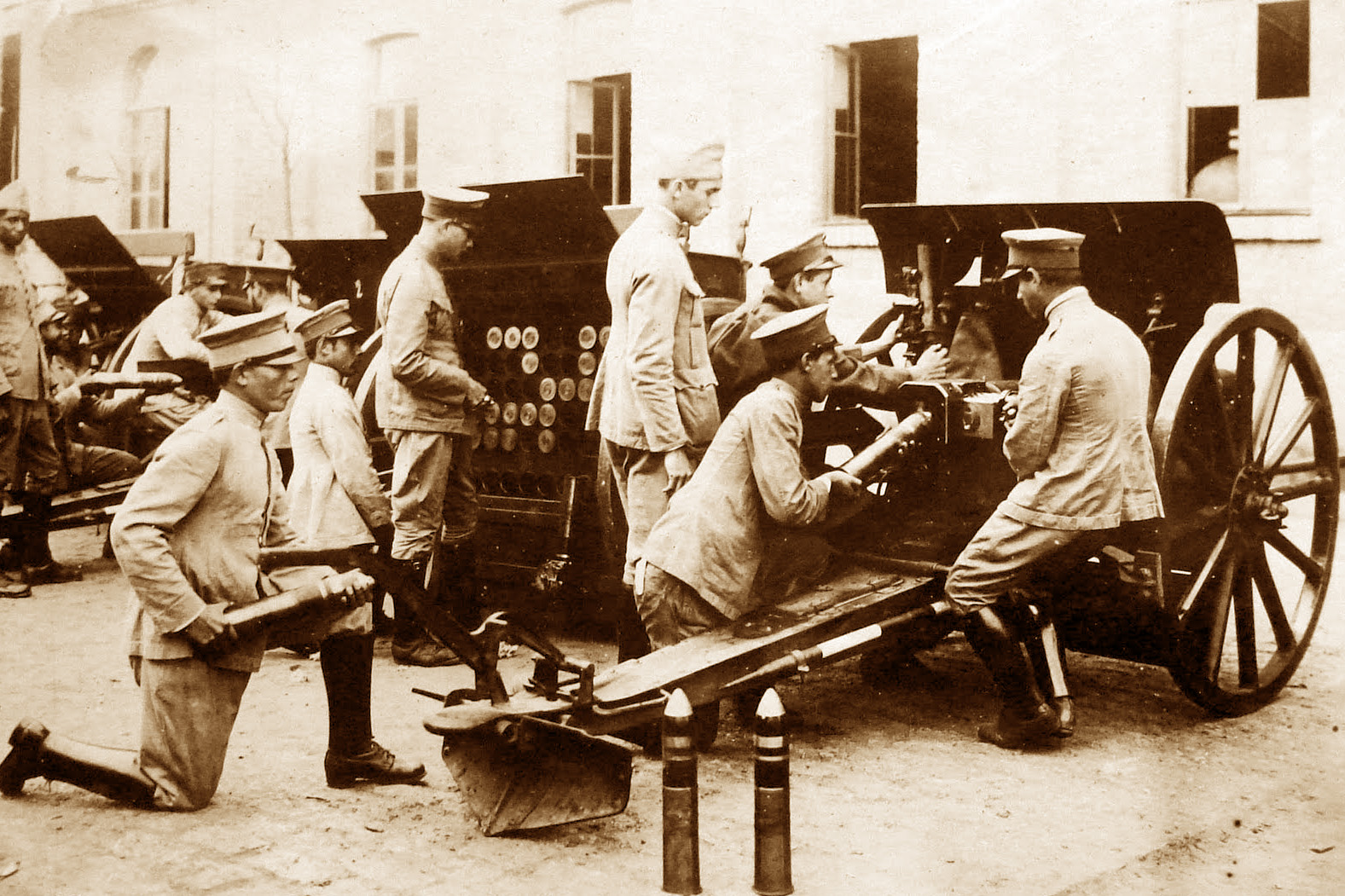
75 mm Krupp guns battery

Both sides of the conflict had considerable firepower; the advantage was with the loyalists. When they left the city, the rebels had twenty 75 mm guns and six 105 mm guns, with 2,000 rounds; approximately 7,000 rifles, 200 machine guns and rifle-machine guns and 2,000,000 cartridges; and horses and automobiles. They had a small industrial capacity in the workshops of the São Paulo Railway, taking advantage of the technical knowledge of immigrants with World War I experience. Despite the lack of resources, various war materials were improvised, such as grenades and artillery ammunition. This activity can be exemplified by confidential requests from Maximiliano Agid, commander of the Hungarian battalion, to Isidoro, requesting dynamite, gunpowder, fuse, bottles, iron tubes and washers for the manufacture of grenades.

The loyalists had the most modern equipment in the army, far superior to the rebels in artillery, aviation, and armor. With the arrival of reinforcements, the loyalists gathered more than a hundred cannons, more modern than those of the revolutionaries, including the most powerful artillery of the conflict, the 155 mm Schneider cannons brought from Rio de Janeiro.

According to the Diário Nacional newspaper, Navy Minister Alexandrino de Alencar proposed the use of poisonous gases against the rebels. Colonel Álvaro Bittencourt Carvalho, who could manufacture them, refused due to the "savagery of such war processes, condemned even in international struggles".

=== Aviation ===
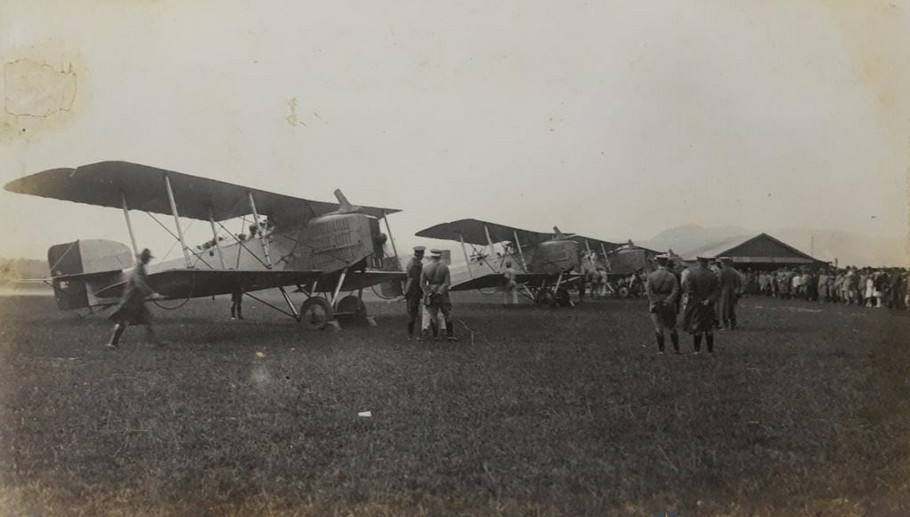
Breguet 14 of Military Aviation

The revolutionaries resorted to aviation because they were unable to reconnoitre the loyalist positions in Penha and Ipiranga. The existing planes in the city were confiscated to form an aviation service, headed by lieutenant Eduardo Gomes and helped by Public Force lieutenant Antônio Reinaldo Gonçalves and the aviator Anésia Pinheiro Machado, experts in São Paulo airstrips, such as Campo de Marte. The first flight, on 13 July, and subsequent flights were used for aerial reconnaissance and distribution of leaflets. The third reconnaissance mission was over Sorocaba and from there to Santos, where the intention was to spread revolutionary propaganda over the battleship Minas Geraes. A Navy seaplane took off to intercept the plane piloted by Eduardo Gomes, who, in response, returned to base, while the seaplane overturned and its pilot nearly drowned.

The only offensive expedition by revolutionary aviation was an extreme plan. On 24 July, Eduardo Gomes and Carlos Herdler flew an "Oriole" towards Rio de Janeiro to distribute revolutionary propaganda leaflets. Upon reaching their destination, they would drop a dynamite bomb on the Catete Palace. However, a mechanical failure forced them to land in Cunha, with the plane unusable.

Loyalist aviation was represented by Naval and Army Aviation. Naval Aviation brought six Curtiss F-5L, two Curtiss MF and two HS-2L hydroplanes to Santos, used in coastal patrol. Military Aviation arrived in Mogi das Cruzes on 14 July with six Breguet 14 aircraft, two Nieuports and two Spads, with which it operated from 19 July onwards in observation and liaison. From the 22nd onwards, Stockle grenades and 105 mm howitzers were dropped into enemy territory. The flight took off from an aviation center in Santo Ângelo, near Guaiaúna, just over half an hour's flight from the city.

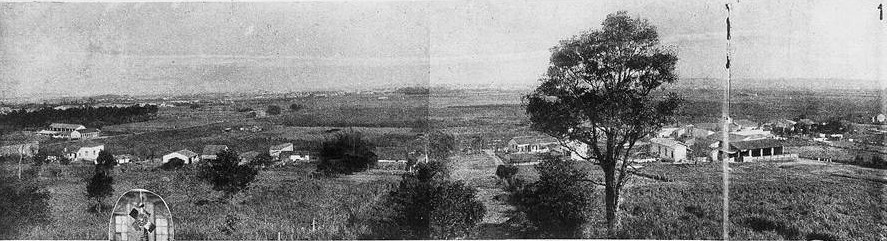
View of Campo de Marte

The use of loyalist aviation was also criticized by Abílio de Noronha. According to him, the reconnaissance flights were of little use, as they took place at excessive heights, yielding vague information; there was no correction of artillery fire using aerial observation; the bombings against the barracks at Luz missed the target; enemy planes flew with impunity, when they could have been intercepted by the Spad; and there were no low-flying infantry fire support. On the other hand, according to journalist Domingos Meirelles, the aerial bombing caused little physical damage, but a great psychological impact.

Neither side had anti-aircraft artillery.

=== Tanks ===
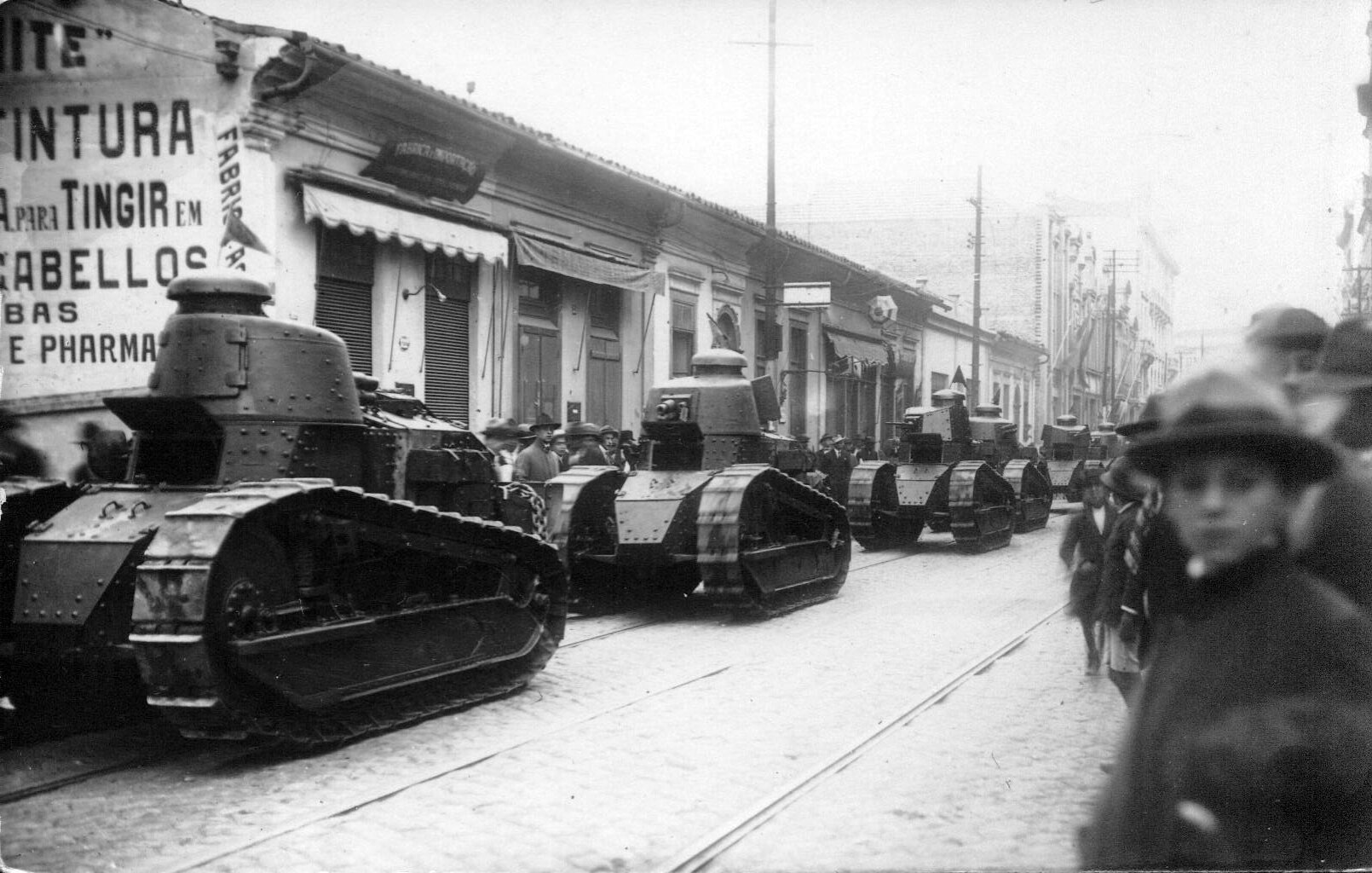
Assault Car Company parades after loyalist victory

The first tank of the Brazilian Army, the Renault FT-17, had its operational debut in 1924. Of the twelve existing units, organized in the Assault Car Company, eleven were transferred to São Paulo. This technology could have been decisive, as, although slow, they had armor that was immune to rifles and machine guns and could easily break through street barricades or destroy fragile defenses with their cannons. Together with accompanying artillery (37 mm guns and mortars), they could have supported infantry attacks. An armored assault could be launched from Brás to the Luz barracks, a few kilometers away.

Sources differ on the use of these vehicles. Abílio de Noronha denied that they were used in combat, but there is at least one record of their operation in Mooca. Ciro Costa and Eurico de Góes mention two operations, without specifying date or location. There are also reports of their use in Belenzinho, where they would have caused panic in the revolutionary lines on the 23rd, but on the 25th, their offensive usefulness had already been nullified by the foreign battalions, who already had experience fighting tanks in Europe. The Renault FT-17s advanced without sufficient infantry support and were stopped by ditches two meters deep; two of them would almost have been captured. There is no record of loss of tanks in São Paulo. After the loyalist victory, they were used in the occupation of the city.

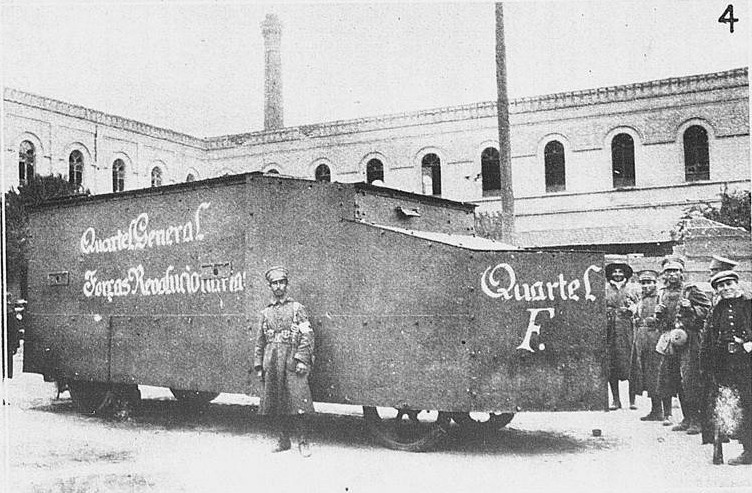
Improvised armored car

The rebels tried to improvise their own armored vehicles, in the first attempt to produce armored vehicles in Brazilian history. At the Railway Workshops in São Paulo, with the help of foreigners with experience in this type of vehicle, two truck chassis were converted into armored cars. One was covered in green painted steel sheets. Entry was through a door at the rear, and the occupants had five loopholes for firing automatic guns. The other had two wooden sheets separated by sand. There was a fixed turret for a machine gun, but the only visibility for the driver and gunner was an opening in the front. None of the vehicles were able to move as the armor was too heavy.

The Navy also tried to attach armor to vehicles, but the fighting ended before they had a chance to come into operation.

=== Rail guns ===
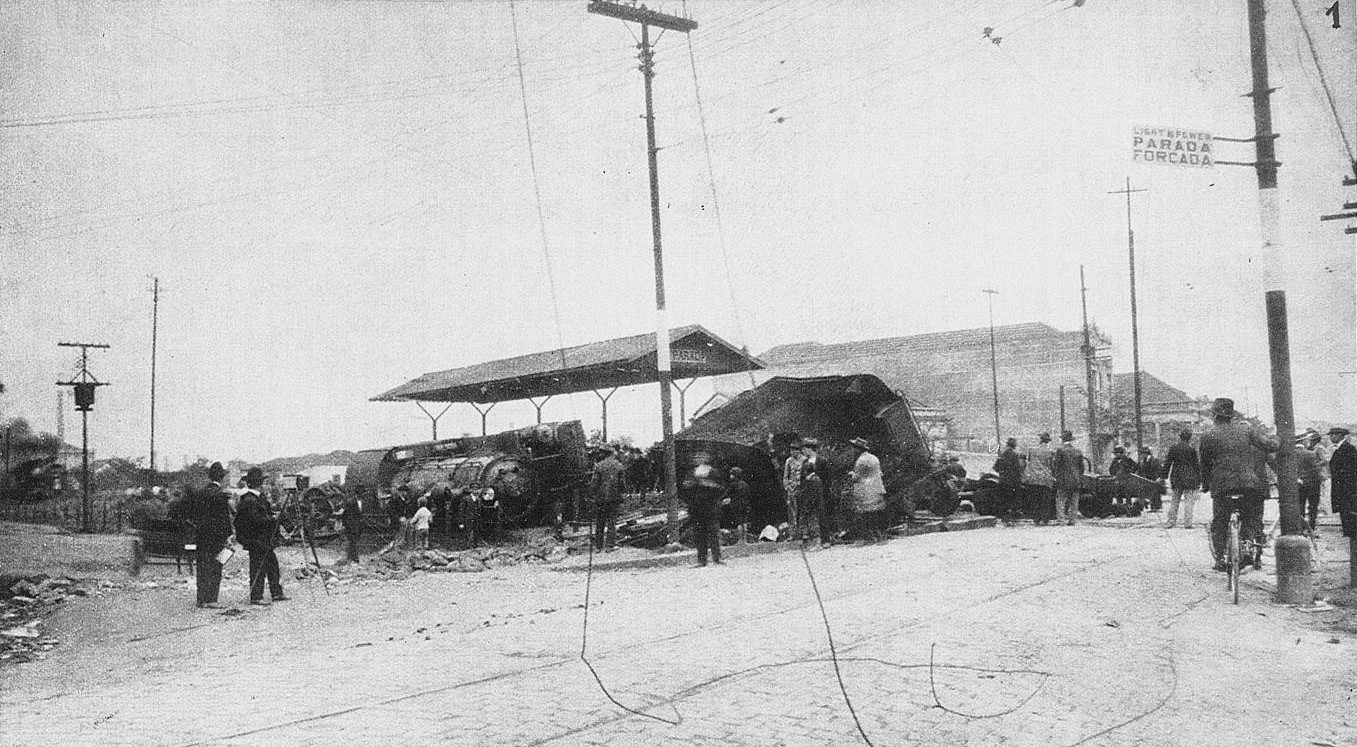
Locomotive of the rebels derailed

In the workshops of the São Paulo Railway, the rebel officers, together with a Hungarian engineer and German technicians, built an armored train. The locomotive had two steel plates in the cabin, while the cars had double wooden walls, filled with sand and painted black, as if they were iron. (Note: Meirelles 2002, p. 142 refers to a locomotive between two cars, used on the 22nd; Castro 2022, p. 62 mentions a locomotive and six cars in an attack a few days later.) Sandbags in the windows allowed soldiers to shoot from inside the cars, and the front car had a rail-sweeper and a makeshift iron turret for a machine gun. The rebels intended to combine this invention with driverless "crazy" or "ghost locomotives" that would be dispatched full steam ahead, loaded with dynamite, into enemy territory.

On 22 July the armored train attacked the loyalists at the Vila Matilde station. The train had difficulty moving around the curves, due to the weight it carried, but it accelerated and surprised the newly arrived soldiers from Rio de Janeiro. The turret's machine gun and armor were effective, and the loyalists reacted by trying to encircle the train, while two station officials intended to divert the line to prevent the train from escaping. The engineer, noticing this maneuver, reversed the march and retreated. The rebels considered this attack a success.

When colonel João Francisco and his second sector commanders launched another attack on the 25th, they fell into an ambush: near the Central do Brasil warehouses, the diversion switch was open. When the commander went down to close it, two artillery rounds exploded a wagon and overturned the locomotive. Another convoy came to help the wounded, but it was also bombed and retreated. The 51 passengers on the first convoy were injured, including colonel João Francisco, and this setback led to a loss of territory the next day. Launches of the "crazy locomotives" on the 27th were also rendered useless by enemy sabotage of the railway line.

Navy loyalists improvised a railway artillery, attaching 16 guns from the warships to eight wagons: two 38 mm guns from Benjamin Constant, two 38 mm Nordenfelt guns from the Naval Academy, eight 47 mm Armstrong from Mato Grosso, Sergipe and Minas Geraes and two 57 mm Nordenfelt from Barroso. The work was supervised by corvette captain Roberto Ruedes de Carvalho at Companhia Docas de Santos. These cannons were used in Mooca, where the rebels responded with a 75 mm cannon.
