= Tertuliano Potiguara =

Brazilian politician

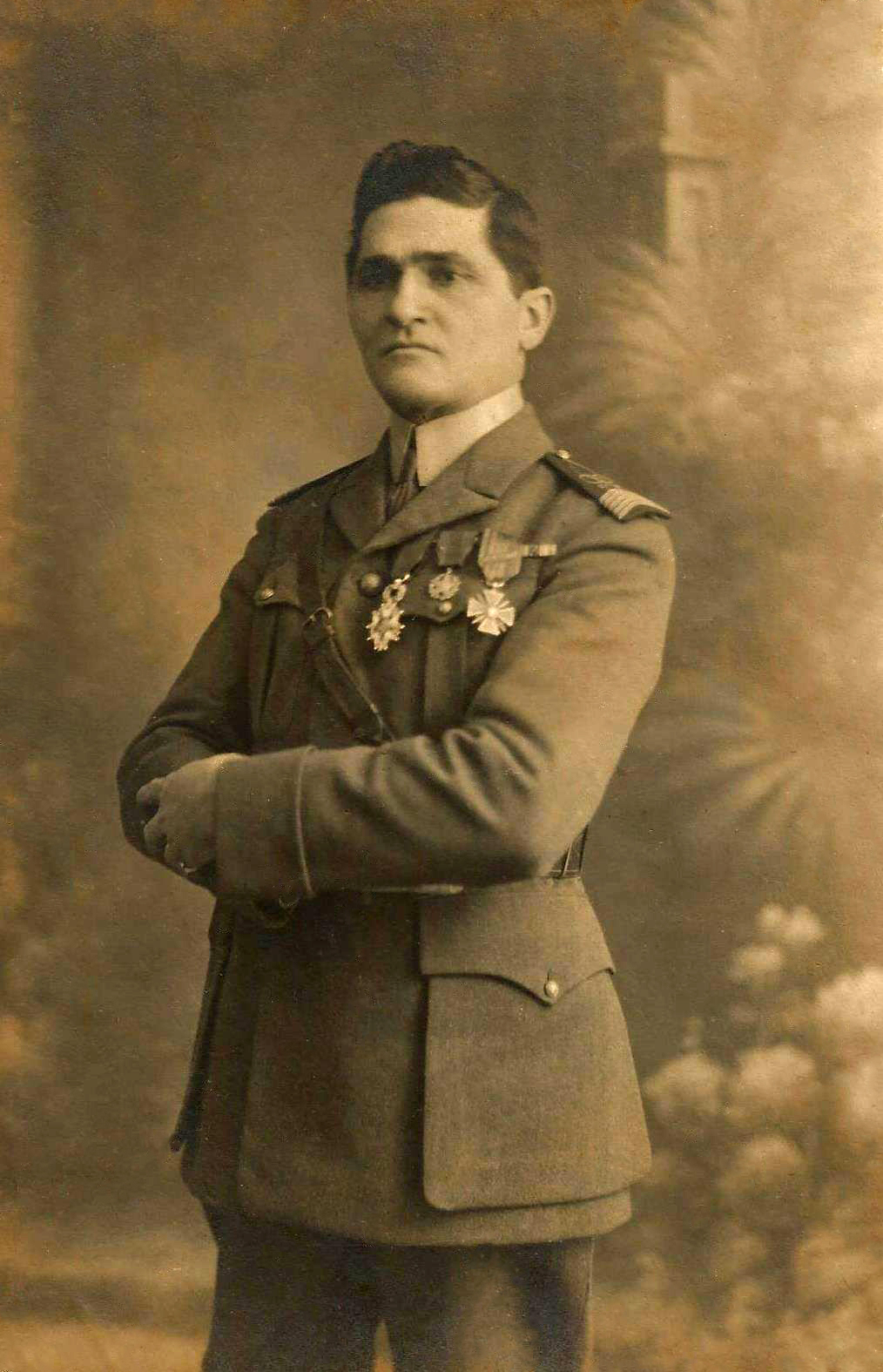
- Born: 27 April 1873; Sobral, Ceará, Brazil
- Died: 30 July 1957 (aged 84); Rio de Janeiro, Rio de Janeiro, Brazil
- Military career
- Allegiance: Empire of Brazil; First Brazilian Republic; Second Brazilian Republic
- Branch: Imperial Brazilian Army; Brazilian Army
- Service years: 1889–1932
- Rank: Division general
- Conflicts: Vaccine Revolt; Contestado War; World War I; Hundred Days Offensive; Battle of St Quentin Canal (WIA); São Paulo Revolt of 1924; Constitutionalist Revolution

Tertuliano de Albuquerque Potiguara (27 April 1873 – 30 July 1957) was a Brazilian Division General who was known for being a primary commander of the Contestado War but remained a controversial figure during the war due to being accused of committing war crimes.

== Biography ==
Son of Antonio Domingos da Silva, Portuguese by birth, and of Rosa Cândida de Albuquerque, he was born in Serra da Meruoca within the land of Sobral, Ceará. He studied at the Colégio Militar de Fortaleza and later served in the Brazilian Army in, in Rio de Janeiro.

He was promoted to ensign on 3 November 1894 and to 1st lieutenant on 6 June 1907 and captain on 7 April 1909. He was also a personal friend of Floriano Peixoto. He served in the Federal Capital Police Brigade in the rank of major from 1910 to 1914. He then participated in both the Vaccine Revolt and the Contestado War but was a controversial figure at the latter due to being accused of war crimes during the war.

With Brazil's entry into World War I at the end of 1917, the Brazilian government sent a mission to France in 1918, in which Potiguara participated but was wounded in the Battle of St Quentin Canal. He was then promoted to lieutenant colonel for acts of bravery practiced in the battles there. On 8 July 1921, he was promoted to colonel by merit, Brigadier General on 20 January 1923 and finally Major General on 6 November 1926.

Serving as a loyalist, he fought in the São Paulo Revolt of 1924, commanding the Potiguara Brigade under general Eduardo Sócrates, engaging in urban combat against the rebel lieutenants of the Army and the Public Force of São Paulo and leading the repression at Mooca. In 1932, alongside the lieutenants he had fought 8 years earlier, he fought against the Constitutionalist Revolution.

He was elected federal deputy for Ceará in the First Republic. One day, upon receiving a package in the mail, the package contained dynamite which exploded, ripping off his arm. He then died at Rio de Janeiro at the age of 87.
