= Death Column =

Military unit in the São Paulo Revolt of 1924

5th Battalion of Caçadores
- 5.º Batalhão de Caçadores
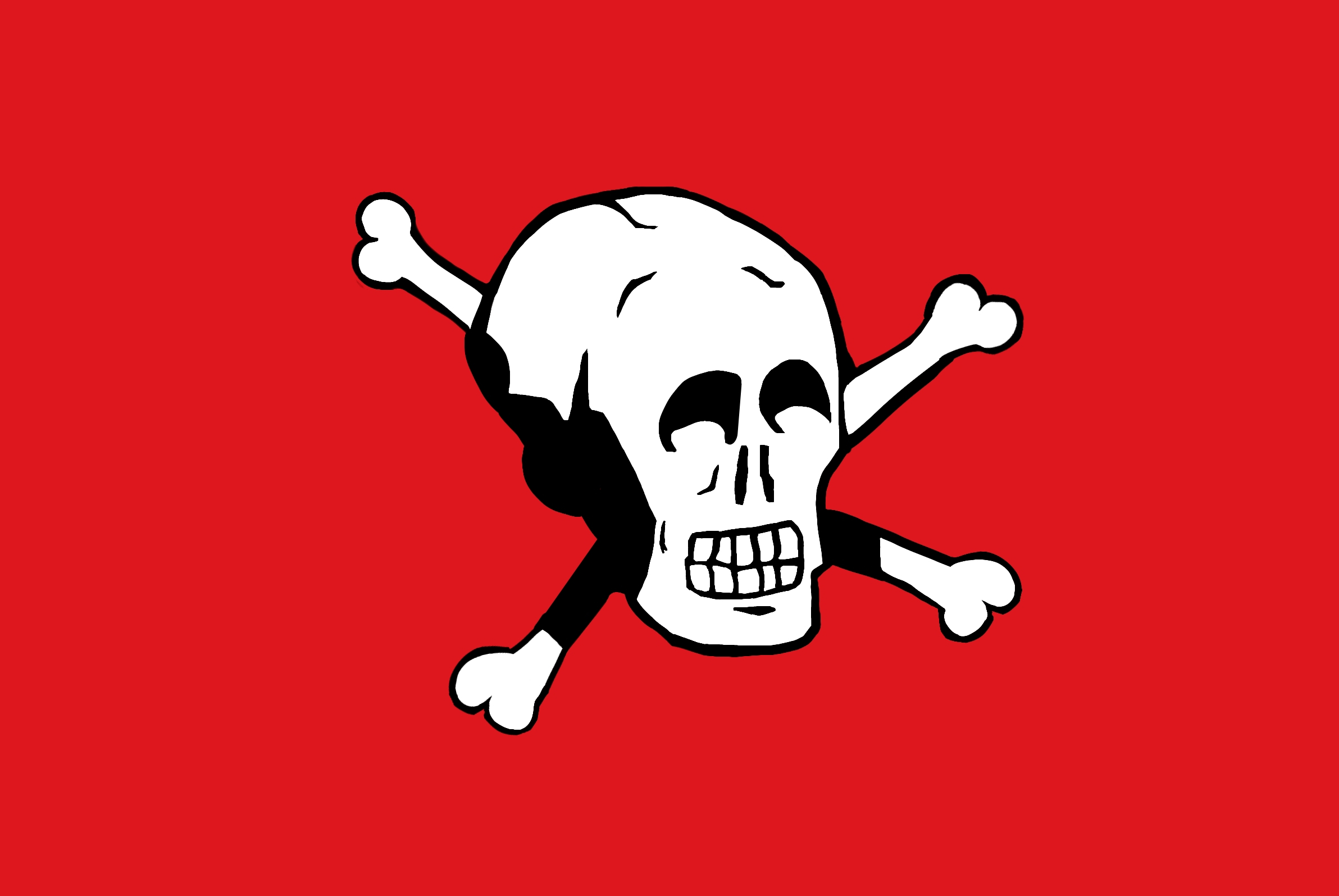
- Flag of the Death Column
- Active: 1924–1925
- Allegiance: Tenentist revolutionary army
- Type: Infantry
- Size: 95 (originally)
- Part of: 3rd Brigade (in late July 1924)
- Nickname: Death Column

Commanders
- Commander: João Cabanas

The Death Column (Portuguese: Coluna da Morte) was a military unit in the São Paulo Revolt of 1924, part of the tenentist forces in arms against the president of Brazil, Artur Bernardes. Commanded by João Cabanas, an officer of the Public Force of São Paulo, the column went on campaign on 19 July 1924, fighting loyalist forces in São Paulo and Paraná until the end of April 1925, when its commander left the revolutionary forces. Column members continued to fight as part of the Miguel Costa-Prestes Column. The denomination of "Death Column" was never official, and among the revolutionaries it was called "the battalion" or, after August 1924, the "5th Battalion of Caçadores", subordinated to the 3rd Brigade, commanded by Miguel Costa.

The column initially had 95 men from the Public Force (the "state army") of São Paulo, growing over time by incorporating civilian volunteers and prisoners. Its first mission was on the Mogiana Railway, as part of the campaigns in the interior of São Paulo. Loyalists commanded by general Martins Pereira threatened to take Campinas and cut off access to the interior by the rebels in the city of São Paulo. Applying the principles of psychological and maneuver warfare, Cabanas conquered Mogi Mirim and defeated numerically superior forces from the Public Force of Minas Gerais and irregular "patriotic battalions".

After the withdrawal of the bulk of the revolutionaries from the capital of São Paulo, on 28 July, the "Death Column" was tasked with defending the rear of the rebels as they traveled along the Sorocabana Railway to the Paraná River. On the way, the column sabotaged the railway infrastructure to slow the loyalist advance and had several skirmishes with the government troops that followed at its heels. At the end of October, with the revolutionaries settled in the extreme west of Paraná, the Death Column defended their flank on the Piquiri River. Its greatest achievement in the Paraná campaign was in Formigas, on 21 January 1925, when it opened a path through the forest and launched a surprise attack on the rear of the loyalists who were attacking Catanduvas. The column was not destroyed by the final loyalist offensive against Catanduvas on 27 March, and it took part in the revolutionaries' retreat to Paraguay; however, João Cabanas was already too ill to continue and left command, an act execrated by his comrades.

The column's achievements had great repercussions in the popular imagination and in the government press, creating a myth around Cabanas. A charismatic leader for his troops, righteous with his supporters and intimidating for his enemies, Cabanas was characterized by government supporters as a truculent leader, responsible for violence against the population and public property. While in exile, he published the book A coluna da morte sob o comando do tenente Cabanas, in which he reacted to the accusations and presented a positive self image of a righteous and revolutionary leader. His importance as a military leader was recognized by loyalists in his day and later historians.

== Organization ==
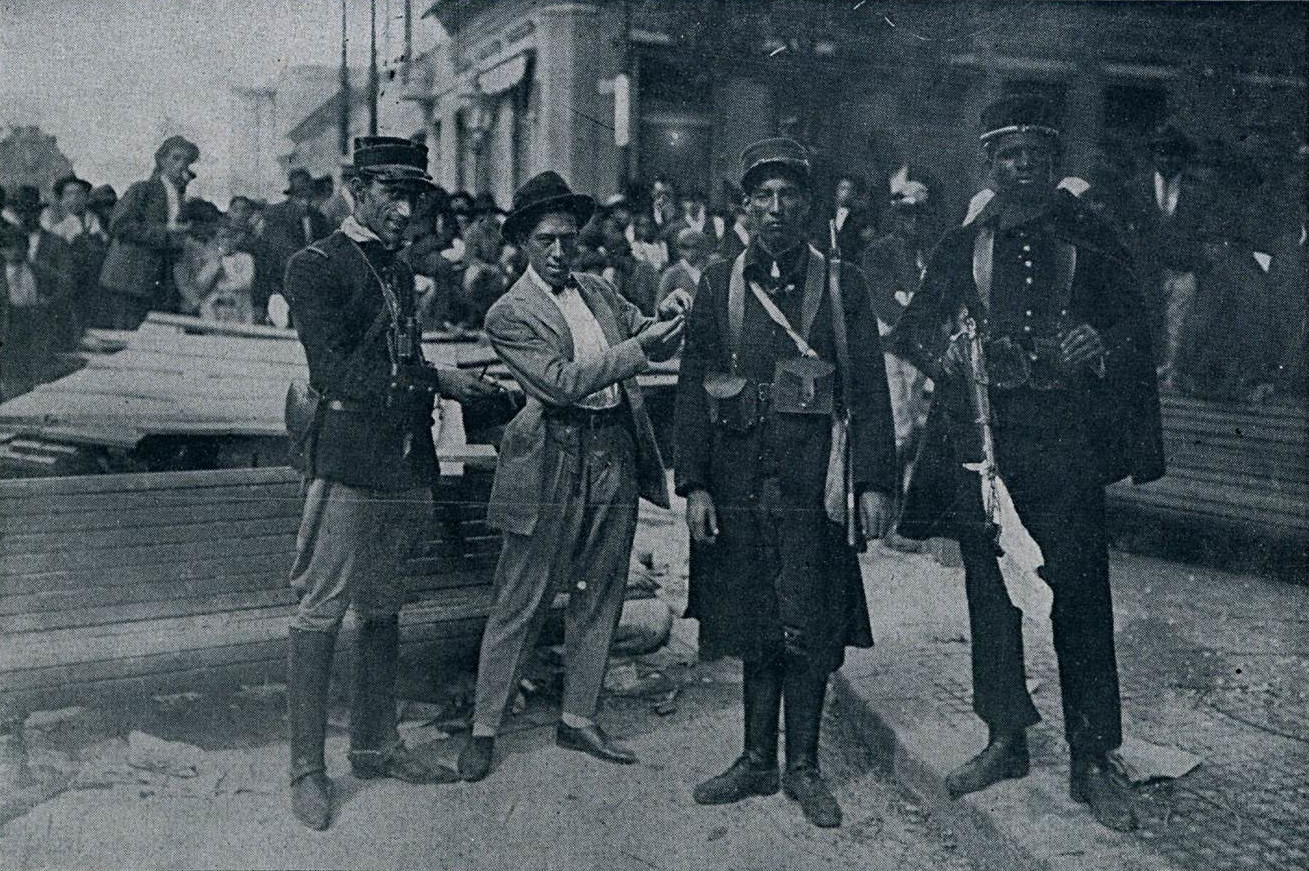
João Cabanas (first on the left) in the fighting in São Paulo before the formation of the column

The "Death Column" was one of three forces sent to the interior of São Paulo by the tenentist revolutionaries, commanded by general Isidoro Dias Lopes, who controlled part of the city of São Paulo. While urban warfare was waged against the loyalists, more loyalist reinforcements converged on São Paulo from Rio de Janeiro, Santos, Paraná, Mato Grosso and Minas Gerais. Inland, the revolutionaries already controlled Itu, Jundiaí, Campinas and Rio Claro on 9 July. Throughout the month, they consolidated their strength in the São Paulo-Campinas-Sorocaba triangle and extended to Bauru and Araraquara. The approach of several loyalist forces in the interior threatened to besiege and lock the revolutionaries in the capital of São Paulo, putting an end to the revolution. Thus, between 17 and 19 July, army captain Otávio Muniz Guimarães was sent to the Paulista and Noroeste railways; the captain of the Public Force Francisco Bastos to the Sorocabana Railway and Public Force lieutenant João Cabanas to the Mogiana Railway.

This force initially consisted of soldiers from the Public Force of São Paulo, recognized at the time for their military professionalism, obtained through French training. There were only infantry and a small artillery component. Over time, the number grew due to the incorporation of civilians and prisoners. Cabanas called both his troops and the irregular forces of his opponents, the "patriotic battalions" of the Republican Party of São Paulo, "bandits". There was only one regular officer, and even some of the corporals and sergeants were amateurs. Cabanas started the campaign as a lieutenant and, by the end of the operations in Paraná, he was already a lieutenant colonel within the revolutionary forces.

Under Cabanas' command, the daily discipline of the barracks was relaxed, but indiscipline in operations was strictly punished. The bugle ringtones were based on Brazilian folk music. The insignia (a skull on a red flag) and proper name ("Death Column") reinforced the troop's morale. "Death Column" was never a formal name of the organization. Originally Cabanas referred to his strength among the revolutionaries as "the battalion".

== Operations ==
=== Mogiana campaign ===
==== Forces in the region ====
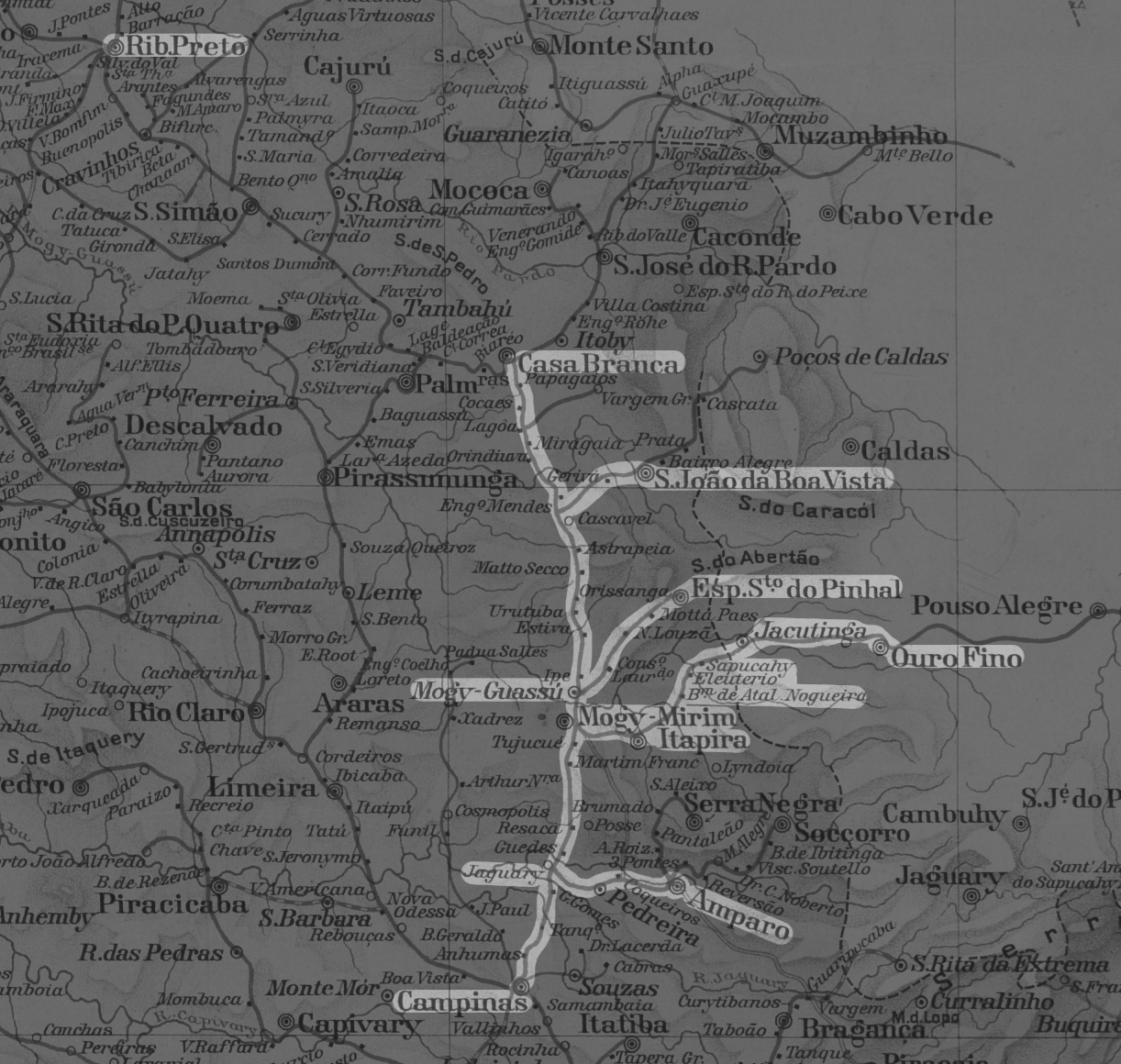
Map with places visited by loyalists or revolutionaries in the Mogiana Railway

The force of João Cabanas left São Paulo at 04:00 on 19 July, numbering 95 men, a piece of mountain artillery, three machine guns and four submachine guns. Their objective was to defeat the loyalist forces of general Martins Pereira in Mogi Mirim, from where they planned to attack Campinas. The strategy outlined by Euclides Figueiredo, of the cabinet of the Ministry of War, was a loyalist flank movement, advancing through Mogi and Campinas to cut the revolutionary fleeing path.

Initially, the revolutionaries accredited having barely 300 men in Mogi Mirim, recruited by local politicians, but according to general Abílio de Noronha, there were actually 1,200 men. According to the sources from the perspective of the Public Force of São Paulo, the loyalist regular forces did not have more than 800 men, made up of the majority of the 5th Infantry Battalion (BI) of the Public Force of Minas Gerais, with minor contributions from batteries of the 2nd Regiment of Mounted Artillery and a platoon (some dozens of men) of the 1st Regiment of Divisional Cavalry, in addition to loyalists from the Public Force of São Paulo, belonging to the 4th Battalion. The 1,200 men figure would include the patriots and policemen in the Pirassununga-Ribeirão Preto axis.

Upon arriving in Campinas the same day, lieutenant Cabanas was informed that the loyalist vanguard, the 5th BI, under the command of major Amaral, had 800 men in Mogi, Jaguariúna and Itapira. However, according to Paulo René de Andrade, who wrote from the point of view of the Public Force of Minas Gerais, the Minas Gerais troops present at that moment were the Amaral contingent or battalion, under the command of captain (commissioned in major) Octavio Campos do Amaral. It was an improvised unit, still poorly armed, of police detachments from the south of Minas Gerais. (Note: Andrade 1976, p. 82, quantifies this contingent at 140 men present in Mogi in August, without stating that they were the entire staff.) The 5th BI was commanded by lieutenant colonel Joviano de Mello, had a staff of 350 men (two companies and a machine gun section) and was not yet in the region, only reaching Ouro Fino on the 21st; then, by order of general Martins, the 2nd Company, with 120 men, was left behind in Ouro Fino and the battalion entered São Paulo without personnel. Its ammunition was negligible, only ten packs of cartridges.

Cabanas reported that major Amaral sent a telegram to the mayor of Campinas threatening to cut off his ears for his pro-tenentist stance. To compensate for its numerical disadvantage, Cabanas sought to deceive the loyalists, convincing them that a strong revolutionary brigade would advance towards Mogi Mirim. He telephoned Ribeirão Preto, declaring that he had a thousand men and six pieces of artillery at his disposal and summoning the local garrison to join him. He then sent similar messages to other locations and spread the word that his small column was just one of several revolutionary forces in the region. In Campinas, he destroyed the telegraph and telephone lines to the north and threatened to shoot the employees of the Mogiana Company if they disobeyed.

==== Battle of Mogi Mirim ====
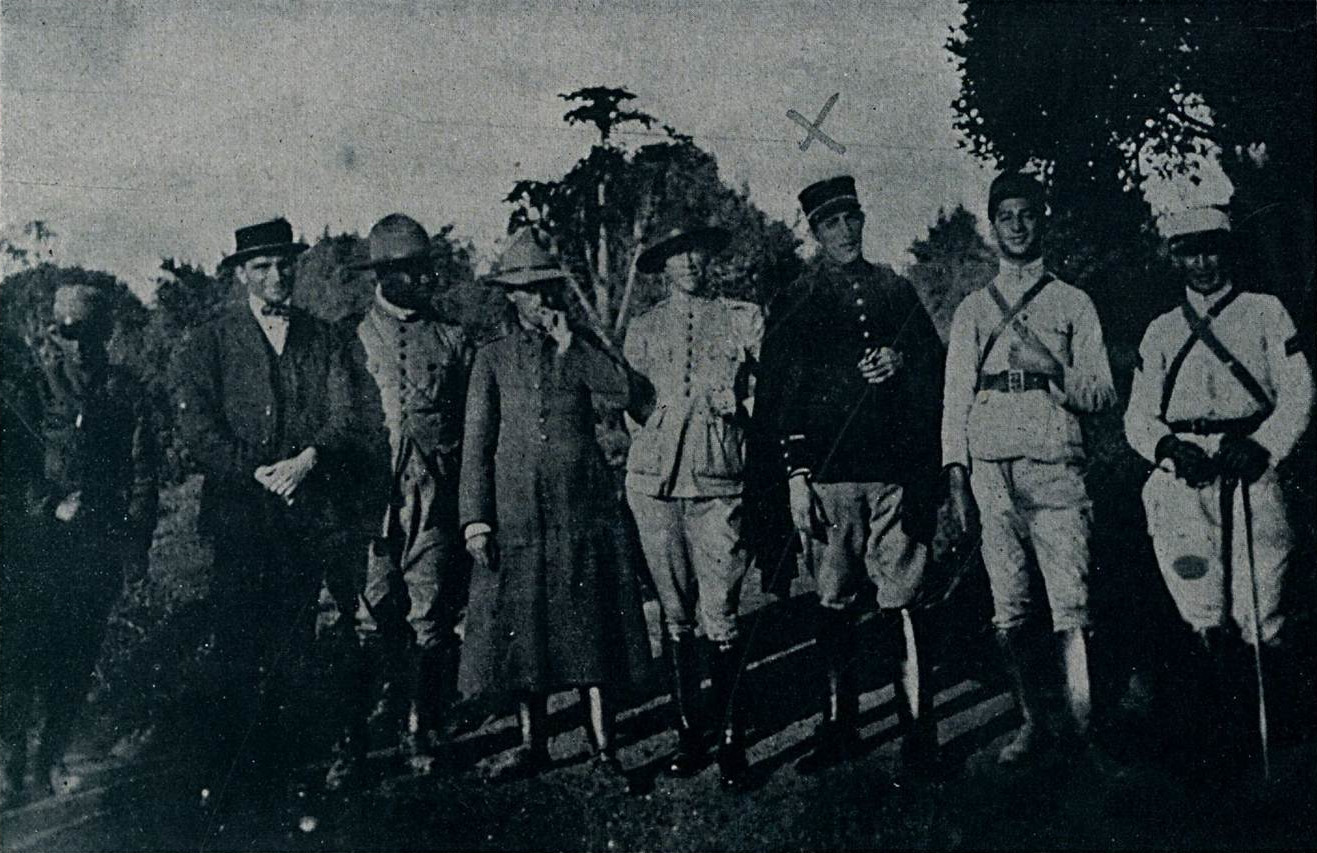
Cabanas (marked with an X) and his general staff in Amparo

The railroad was broken in Campinas. The revolutionaries went in 20 trucks to Jaguariúna, disembarked at night and marched for three kilometers at dawn on 20 July. In Cabanas' account, a small number of Minas Gerais troops in the city was defeated, with four soldiers killed and 16 prisoners, at the cost of two dead and five wounded for the revolutionaries. The loyalists counter-attacked on the Atibaia River, without success. In his account, Cabanas praised the bravery of the loyalist combatants, but emphasized even more the virtue of his side. From Jaguariúna, the revolutionaries changed direction to the east and went by train, in secret, to Amparo. There was a detachment of the Public Force in the city, which offered no resistance and was forcibly incorporated into the column. (Note: Loyalist forces in Jaguariúna and Amparo are represented by platoons on the map in Santos 2013, p. 47.)

At night, the column turned north and went on foot to Itapira, a journey of almost 30 kilometers. To keep the displacement secret, all civilians in the path were incorporated into the column. Cabanas divided the column into three platoons and attacked at 10:00 on 21 July, with the loyalists still imagining that the attack would be on Mogi Mirim. The strongest loyalist resistance, in the Public Prison, was defeated. São Paulo sources then recorded that a force of 400 loyalists was advancing from the east, coming from Jacutinga; thus, the revolutionary column was threatened on both sides (with Mogi Mirim to the west). This loyalist advance was defeated in an ambush east of Itapira on 23 July.

According to Minas Gerais sources, the 5th BI was still in Eleutério, on its way to Itapira, when the revolutionaries (supposedly 500 men) conquered the city. The battalion landed in Rio do Peixe and, two kilometers from the city, realized that an attack would be unfeasible. At midnight the Minas Gerais troops received the order to retreat to Sapucaí, and from there to Jacutinga, from where they were dispersed before the 23rd: 120 men from the 1st Company in Sapucaí and then Barão de Ataliba, 50 in Pinhal and 60 (including the command of the battalion and the machine gun section) in Jacutinga. During this period colonel Monte arrived in Jacutinga with the army's cavalry platoon and artillery battery. For Paulo René de Andrade, this dispersion of personnel made the 5th BI vulnerable and ineffective, and the continuous movements prevent an accurate picture of events.

From Itapira, João Cabanas ordered the sabotage of tracks and bridges and spread the rumor that he would attack Mogi Mirim from the east, leading general Martins to entrench that direction. The revolutionaries turned around and, in a journey of 90 kilometers by various means, returned to Amparo and Jaguariúna to attack Mogi Mirim from the south. The maneuver was risky and would be crushed if general Martins realized the deception. But the loyalists were taken by surprise and, believing themselves to be under attack from two directions (south and east), abandoned the city. This victory resulted in the addition of 60 loyalist soldiers to the column, which now numbered 180 men, equivalent to a company.

==== Ribeirão Preto ====
In Mogi Mirim, Cabanas was informed that a thousand loyalists, mainly patriotic volunteers, were grouping in Ribeirão Preto under the command of Public Force lieutenant Inocêncio da Silva. Cabanas resorted to illusion: railway trains requisitioned at the city station received "cannons" made of wooden logs, "machine guns" made of canvas-covered bamboo and "ammunition" in empty crates. In the front wagon followed a 105 mm cannon, in reality a pitch-blackened peroba log next to two wagon wheels. At each station the revolutionaries passed through, they fired shots in the air, shouted and sang to give the impression of having much larger numbers.

When the column reached the Casa Branca railway station, the small loyalist detachment present there, of about 20 men, joined without resistance. The loyalists in Ribeirão Preto, believing they were facing a great force, demobilized, and Cabanas interrupted the movement, as the threat had already passed. On the 24th, the column quickly proceeded to Eleutério to repel a cavalry force, which retreated to Pouso Alegre without offering combat. Cabanas numbered 300 loyalists in this force, but as there was only one cavalry platoon in the loyalist order of battle, the actual number was likely much lower.

On the 25th the revolutionaries returned to Campinas. Cabanas suggested acting in Itu or Santo Amaro, but his plans received no response from the revolutionary command. In turn, the loyalists from Minas Gerais suspected that the revolutionaries were going to invade Minas Gerais and transferred the 2nd Company of the 5th BI to Sapucaí, where they damaged the railway line.

==== Espírito Santo do Pinhal ====
To maintain the offensive, the revolutionaries decided to attack Espírito Santo do Pinhal, where they estimated there were between 200 and 600 loyalist soldiers. According to the report from Minas Gerais, there were only 50 soldiers from the 5th BI, led by lieutenant Arquimimo Chaves. Minas Gerais sources also give a high number for the revolutionaries, quantifying 300 São Paulo police soldiers who would have attacked the city.

The revolutionaries attacked on 26 July. The displacement was secret, imprisoning all car passengers along the way and burning their vehicles. Arriving by train three kilometers from Pinhal, the vanguard was met by an ambush. According to the São Paulo report, the loyalists were well prepared, with trenches in the dominant positions and even artillery. Divided into three groups, the revolutionaries fought their way into the city and forced the loyalists to withdraw. They are reported to have killed nine of the enemy and captured 20 prisoners, 1,200 rifles, 14 boxes of 75mm artillery ammunition, two heavy machine guns, and other materiel, at the cost of six revolutionaries killed. On the other hand, the report by the commander of the 5th BI presented loyalist defenders at a great disadvantage in terms of numbers and weapons. The battalion called for reinforcements, and when it retreated, it found them on the way: a truck, a lieutenant, nine soldiers and a wedge of ammunition. The Minas Gerais troops registered two dead and five wounded on their side and eleven dead on their opponents. The combat lasted from 10:00 am to 14:30. (Note: Andrade 1976, pp. 76–78. The author does not mention any other force in the city besides the contingent of the 5th BI, but mentions that general Martins Pereira had left weapons, material and ammunition in the place.)

The revolutionary column withdrew from Pinhal after the battle, heading north to São João da Boa Vista and then returning to Mogi Mirim. The troops from Minas Gerais all gathered in Jacutinga on the 27th and the following day, accompanied by army troops, they went to Itapira. General Martins Pereira's column failed in its objective of taking Campinas, and he was replaced in command by general Malan d'Angrogne.

According to Cabanas, in Mogi Mirim he was approached by four men from Triângulo Mineiro, proposing a trip to Uberaba, where they said they had between two and four thousand men available. With that force, they would march to Belo Horizonte to overthrow the government of Minas Gerais, and in exchange, Triângulo would become a new state of the federation. From there, the revolutionaries would go to Barra do Piraí to cut the route between Rio de Janeiro and São Paulo. Before he could attempt this plan, Cabanas received a call from Álvaro Ribeiro, appointed by the revolutionaries as the governor of Campinas, informing him of the evacuation of São Paulo by the rebels.

=== Withdrawal from São Paulo ===
On 27 July, the revolutionary high command in São Paulo decided to abandon the city and move all its forces to Mato Grosso, passing through Campinas and Bauru. The revolutionaries were successful on the Noroeste and Mogiana railways, but the loyalist victory in the Sorocabana Railway threatened to cut off the escape route in Campinas. The bulk of the revolutionaries reached Bauru on the 28th. The Death Column covered their retreat in Mogi Mirim and was one of the last forces to retreat, reaching Campinas at 04:00 on the 28th, when the last convoy from São Paulo passed. The unit was transformed into the 5th Battalion of Caçadores of the 3rd Revolutionary Brigade, commanded by general Miguel Costa. (Note: Savian 2020, p. 98, citing the testimony of the commander of the first battalion in O Paiz, 8 April 1925.) At the beginning of August, this battalion already had 380 men well armed and equipped, four heavy machine guns and a piece of artillery.

The revolutionary division began its journey from Bauru to Porto Tibiriçá (currently Presidente Epitácio), on the border with Mato Grosso, on 31 July. From 1 August, the 3rd (major Juarez Távora's) and 5th Battalions defended the rearguard of the revolutionaries on their way from Bauru to Botucatu. At São Manuel, they repulsed an attack by the Malan d'Angrogne column; however, in his account, the loyalist general recorded heavy losses for the revolutionaries (73 prisoners and seven dead).

From then on, the 6th Battalion carried out rearguard actions on its own; as part of these actions, it was tasked with sabotaging the railway infrastructure to slow the loyalist advance. The task was conducted by the battalion's "Destruction Detachment", later called the "Engineering Detachment", commanded by sergeant Filógono Antônio Theodoro, commissioned as a lieutenant. "Bridges, wagons, water tanks for supplying steam locomotives, rails, telegraph poles, keys, telegraphs, everything was blown up with dynamite". The trajectory was 1,200 kilometers in Sorocabana, passing through Ourinhos and Presidente Prudente. Along the way, the rearguard faced the Azevedo Costa column, consisting of loyalists from the south of São Paulo and Paraná, who followed in their wake. There was a lack of water and firewood for the trains, and government jagunços took advantage of the dry climate to set fire to the forests on the side of the road, further complicating travel.

The division's vanguard reached Porto Tibiriçá on 6 August. The revolutionaries crossed the Paraná River, but their incursion into Mato Grosso was defeated at the battle of Três Lagoas on 18 August. They then decided to proceed to Paraná. Meanwhile, the rear guard fought skirmishes at Salto Grande (12 August) and Indiana (crossed after 19 August) and larger engagements at Santo Anastácio (4 September) and Caiuá. (Note: Torres 2000, cap. 7. For the dates of the fights, see the Gazeta de Notícias issue of 15 August and 6 September and O Paiz of 9 September.) At Santo Anastácio the loyalists attacked with the Group of Battalions of Caçadores of the Military Brigade of Rio Grande do Sul. The revolutionaries retreated by train at night. The Rio Grande do Sul troops recorded four killed and six wounded on their side and four killed, 18 wounded and 13 sick captured among the revolutionaries. Cabanas reported the loss of 80 men killed, wounded, and missing.

=== Paraná campaign ===
==== Descent of the river ====
On the descent of the Paraná River, the Cabanas battalion again served as rear guard and was the last to embark. After its departure, the Azevedo Costa column reached Porto Tibiriçá on 10 September. The Cabanas battalion had its first rest period in three months. The displacement of the revolutionary division, divided into several geographically separated echelons, was slow. On 23 September, while the vanguard had almost reached Foz do Iguaçu, in Paraná, the last echelon was still on the border between São Paulo and Mato Grosso.

Taking advantage of this delay, the loyalists of the Military Circumscription of Mato Grosso reoccupied the ports of Jacaré and Dom Carlos, resulting in the surrender without a fight of the revolutionary 7th Battalion of Caçadores on the 25th. João Cabanas was on the other side of the river, but had no way to react. Shortly afterwards, the loyalists were attacked from three sides (Cabanas from the front, general Bernardo Padilha from the right and major Coriolano de Almeida from the left) and, after three days of firefight, they retreated from Porto Jacaré due to lack of ammunition. While the fighting lasted, the echelon could not continue the descent.

==== Defense of the Piquiri river ====
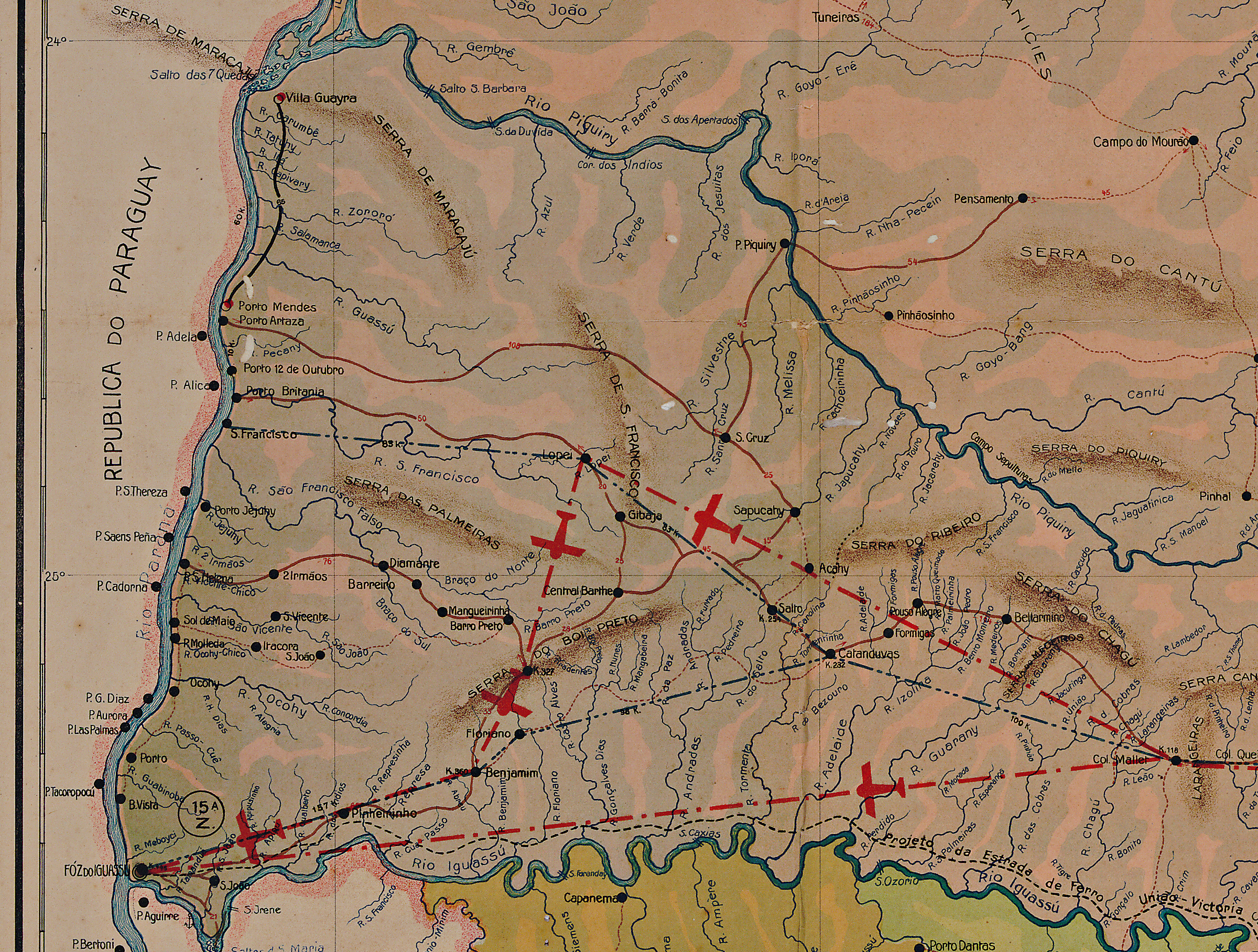
Map of the theater of operations in Paraná

By the end of October, all the revolutionaries had already reached the extreme west of Paraná, settling in the area between the Paraná, Piquiri and Iguaçu rivers. They were opposed by loyalists commanded by general Cândido Rondon. The Death Column was sent ahead of the Piquiri. In his account, Cabanas deported the Argentine landowner Júlio Allica, who was present there, who allegedly received weapons to fight him. Those employed in the production of yerba mate were numerous workers, especially Paraguayans, kept in conditions equivalent to slavery. 287 men and 113 women were incorporated into the column, not all as soldiers, as those unable to fight were assigned to auxiliary tasks.

The revolutionaries were on the defensive, awaiting the arrival of their allies in Rio Grande do Sul, where several garrisons were in a revolt. In Paraná, larger fights took place on the road between Foz do Iguaçu and Guarapuava. The loyalists put pressure on Newton Estillac Leal's brigade, expelling it from Belarmino at the end of December. To help Estillac's brigade, the revolutionaries began a maneuver along the flanks, on one side by captain Bonifácio da Silva and on the other by Cabanas. Bonifácio's troops, made up of Paraguayans, killed him and deserted. Cabanas left Piquiri on 26 December, but had to react to a loyalist offensive coming from Campo Mourão. The loyalists were defeated in an ambush, but Cabanas was instructed to call off the flanking operation.

==== Attack on Formigas ====
From January to the end of March 1925, the Paraná front stagnated in the main revolutionary position, Catanduvas, and in the secondary position, Centenário. (Note: Location in the current municipality of Campo Bonito, see IBGE's map.) The loyalists had the Paraná Detachment in front of Catanduvas and the Santa Catarina Detachment in front of Centenário. The revolts that started in Rio Grande do Sul in the previous months had ended, but a column of revolutionaries, led by Luís Carlos Prestes, was on its way to Paraná. The most notable action in this period was the revolutionary attack on Formigas, a town between Catanduvas and Belarmino. There were supply distribution posts and the beginning of a path to Centenário, connecting the headquarters of the two loyalist detachments. The revolutionary plan was for the Cabanas battalion to make its way through the woods until it attacked Formigas from the rear. The bulk of the Paraná Detachment, positioned in Roncador, would have its rear cut and would be attacked by the bulk of the revolutionaries, positioned in Catanduvas. At the same time, general Rondon was already preparing to transfer his command post to Formigas, from where he could follow the campaign more closely. In addition to the site's tactical importance, the revolutionaries targeted Rondon.

According to Cabanas, his battalion had 280 men at that time. The journey to Formigas lasted 11 days. On 9 January, the column passed through Santa Cruz. After going around Centenário and Salto, the revolutionaries, guided by Paraguayans, spent seven days on a trail, abandoned for ten years, between Centenario and Porto Paraguaio. The reopening of the path, under torrential rains, crossing swamps with dense vegetation, a terrain with many thorns and four watercourses that required the construction of bridges, was laborious. For the attack, Cabanas divided the troops into four groups. He would personally lead one along the trail, while captain Filó would attack at the mouth of the road to Guarapuava; captain Bispo, 100 meters to his right; and captain Ribeiro, on the trail to Centenário (towards the rear of the Santa Catarina Detachment). After reaching Formigas and approaching the camp, fighting broke out at dawn on 21 January.

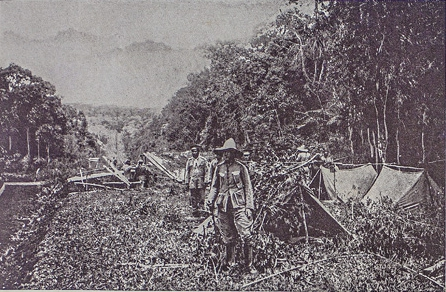

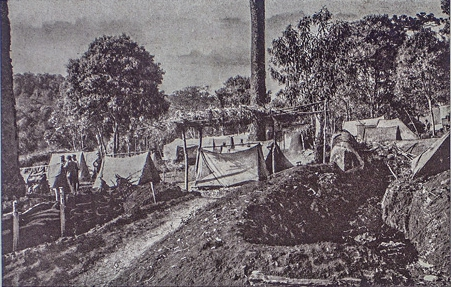
Loyalist trenches and trail in Formigas

The attack is recorded from a loyalist perspective by an anonymous Rio Grande do Sul soldier. His account matches that of Cabanas in the surprise with which the loyalists were caught and the horror created in the camp. But after the panic, the loyalists took up defensive positions and opened artillery fire on the attackers. The numerical inferiority of the revolutionaries was soon felt. According to Cabanas, ordering a retreat would have disintegrated his column, and so he ordered a charge. In the absence of bayonets, the revolutionaries attacked with machetes. The enemy, not knowing how to defend itself, fled through the forest. Later, government emissaries formally complained about the beheading of loyalist soldiers in Formigas. Cabanas denied this accusation, stating that the wounds found on the bodies were the result of violent hand-to-hand combat. The deaths of nine loyalists and six revolutionaries were recorded.

General Rondon's accommodations were already ready in the camp, but he was absent: his limousine got stuck on the road between Formigas and Laranjeiras. The other part of the revolutionary plan, the Catanduvas attack against the loyalist bulk, did not take place, as the revolutionary rear guard in Catanduvas had also been attacked. On the same day, the loyalists were able to surround the revolutionaries in Formigas. Colonel Mariante, commander of the Paraná Detachment, had 2,200 men in the direction of Catanduvas and was able to safely deploy the 1st Battalion of the Military Force of Paraná to attack Formigas. The following morning, the Cabanas battalion entered the forest, returning to Santa Cruz, in friendly territory, on 1 February. In Formigas, the 2nd Battalion of Caçadores, sent by the Santa Catarina Detachment, arrived on 22 January and, by mistake, had a friendly fire incident with the Paraná police, causing five deaths.

This action was the highlight of Cabanas' participation in Paraná and one of the most violent attacks suffered by loyalists in the region. However, the initial success was not taken advantage of by the revolutionaries. Even so, the attack on Formigas delayed the loyalist victory in Paraná, as general Azeredo Coutinho, who assumed command of the two detachments, admitted in February. The Santa Catarina Detachment withdrew its positions further away from Centenário and the Paraná Detachment was distracted by the action in the rear, jeopardizing the offensive plan. The commander of the Santa Catarina Detachment, colonel Varella, resigned. The loyalist command became more cautious, and postponed the attack on Catanduvas until the end of March.

==== Arrival of the Rio Grande do Sul column ====
The final offensive against Catanduvas began on 27 March. Exhausted, starving, low on ammunition and reduced in numbers, the revolutionaries could not resist. At that moment, the Death Column was one of the forces defending the rear of Catanduvas. With 150 men, it was in the locality of Fazenda Floresta, commanded by Juarez Távora, since Cabanas was absent. At 10:40 the column was attacked by the 1st Battalion of the Public Force of Bahia. Pinned to their trenches by automatic weapons fire at the edge of the forest, the defenders were unable to prevent the loyalists from using another route to reach the rear of Catanduvas. Fazenda Floresta was lost to loyalists at 12:30. On the 30th, the revolutionaries in Catanduvas surrendered.

In Rio de Janeiro, the press reported that Cabanas was seriously injured, and the Death Column fled in disorder to Brazil's border. The information was false. The column was still fighting and Cabanas resumed command, although he was beginning to show exhaustion. After the fall of Catanduvas, the remaining revolutionaries retreated towards the Paraná River. The Rio Grande do Sul troops arrived on the Guarapuava–Foz do Iguaçu road on 3 April, in the locality of Benjamim. The link of forces with the São Paulo rebels formed the Miguel Costa-Prestes Column. By mid-April, the revolutionaries were trapped between the Guaçu and São Francisco rivers. Loyalists commanded by captain João Theodoro de Mello had been attacking near Porto Mendes since the 20th.

On 24 April, the Death Column, with about 100 well-armed men, launched a flanking attack against the Mello detachment. Loyalists abandoned their positions, but reorganized themselves a few kilometers further back. The only gain for the revolutionaries was more time for their evacuation plan to Paraguay. Cabanas blamed the lack of cavalry support, which should have gone in pursuit, while Prestes accused him of sabotaging his plan, wanting to abandon the fight and, out of vanity, preventing the others from continuing it. Cabanas called Prestes a coward and, in return, was threatened with arrest and execution.

The breakout from the loyalist siege took place on 27 April. The revolutionaries crossed the Paraná River and entered Paraguayan territory, from where they would enter Brazil again in Mato Grosso. Cabanas did not participate in that campaign and in the rest of the trajectory of the 1st Revolutionary Division, as the column was called. After leaving Brazilian territory, he sought medical treatment in Posadas, Argentina. His health had been failing for some time, and he was now unable to walk and suffering from an intermittent fever caused by malaria; he didn't want to introduce himself to his commanders that way. His companions were unable to convince him to continue fighting and execrated his decision to go into exile. On 27 April he was formally discharged from the revolutionary ranks for desertion, the same penalty applied to Filinto Müller days earlier. The Death Column fighters continued to form part of the Miguel Costa-Prestes Column, reorganized as a cavalry regiment under the command of Siqueira Campos.

== Reputation ==
=== Linked to violence ===
The Death Column garnered fame over the course of its operations, first among fighters and local population, and then in the press. Over time, it was already known when arriving in new cities. The Correio Paulistano newspaper, an organ of the Republican Party of São Paulo, referred to João Cabanas as "famous" from the first news. A whole myth arose around the figure of the leader. The government press gave expressive negative attention to the column, and still in 1924, after the loyalist victory in São Paulo, Cabanas was the protagonist in the equally derogatory film A metralha nos sertões. When Cabanas first published his main self-representation, the book A coluna da morte sob o comando do tenente Cabanas, he was already reacting to a widely disseminated negative image. The backlash of the book kept him in the press and public imagination, and his deeds created a popular image of revolution, contributing to the later Prestes Column.

In the popular imagination, the members of the Death Column were seen either as vigilantes or as looters, depending on the political preference of the observer. Loyalists imputed crimes to the column even after it had already left a region. The government's view, recorded in writing by the newspapers and by the police investigation of the revolt, in which Cabanas was convicted, saw him as a truculent military man, marked by violence. Numerous crimes were imputed to his commanders, with the responsibility falling on him: the depredation of public property (including the destruction of railways in the retreat), release of prisoners, theft of public money, threats and murders. In the popular myth of Cabanas, he appeared as the "very incarnation of evil", who would have made a deal with the devil. The black cape he wore was said to be invulnerable to gunfire. He would have a "closed body", never injured, and his column would never lose a battle.

Cabanas' book was his reaction to this stigma, in which he created a positive image of a righteous man willing to transgress norms for the good of the nation. An example of this is the case of an attempted rape carried out by two column fighters on a girl in Indiana. The event had already been described by Correio Paulistano, but Cabanas' account also includes the punishment of those responsible. Cabanas presented his discipline as rigorous and even cruel to control any bad elements in the column. Destruction of the railway infrastructure was described as a painful mission. Hélio Tenório dos Santos, from the São Paulo Military Police, criticized the accusations of simple vandalism, launched by the loyalist press, as the practice had military necessity, which is recognized by the police investigation, which preferred to emphasize the "savagery" practiced by the troops among the population. As for the theft of public money, Santos noted Cabanas' "honesty and rigor" in leaving receipts with the amounts requested. Requisitions were sometimes paid for with coffee from the warehouses of government leaders.

The column's informal name itself is part of the violent reputation and was used by Cabanas to intimidate their enemies. The name "Death Column" arose among soldiers after the violence of combat in Espírito Santo do Pinhal. One explanation for the name is that soldiers would not expect to come out of column operations alive. Cabanas gave a political explanation: death would be "for bad Brazilians, for despotism, for defenders and representatives of the government that the revolution was fighting". The name was frowned upon by loyalists; for colonel Irany Paraná do Brasil, Cabanas chose it because he "wanted to kill".

=== As a military force ===
Instilling terror in opponents was part of Cabanas' strategy, an impact that he himself emphasized in his reports. In addition to intimidation, the Death Column employed counterintelligence, which subverted the enemy in the Mogiana campaign. For his ruses, such as counterfeiting weapons on trains and spreading lies through telegrams, Cabanas is considered a pioneer of psychological warfare in Brazil.

Hélio Tenório dos Santos, analyzing the Mogiana campaign, also observed the ability of the Death Column in the war of movement, obeying the principles of mass, information, maneuver and surprise. In the words of Cabanas, the procedure was to "attack the enemy at his weakest points and move as quickly as possible, appearing here and there to make people believe that the attack was being carried out by different contingents". The lack of defensive preparation by his opponent, who intended to continue to Campinas, and the mistakes made by general Martins Pereira also contributed. The loyalist command over-dispersed its forces, which were defeated individually, and acted passively, ceding the initiative to the Death Column. Loyalist contemporaries, Euclides Figueiredo and Malan d'Angrogne, also had a negative evaluation of Martins Pereira's leadership. According to Paulo René de Andrade, the distribution of police officers from Minas Gerais to various cities, "if it had been determined by the opposing command, perhaps it would not have come out so well and to the satisfaction of the rebels".

Military historian Elonir José Savian listed Cabanas as one of the revolutionary leaders who truly exercised leadership. He was esteemed by his soldiers, "one of the virtues of a military commander", according to Francisco Moacir Assunção Filho. In combat, he participated directly on the front line to exert more influence on the troops, at the cost of being wounded in combat twice.

The police inquiry into the revolt admits Cabanas' military relevance, describing him as "one of the best known leaders of the seditious movement", "one of the most fearsome elements of the revolution" and "one of the most efficient elements of the subversive movement". Hélio Tenório dos Santos praised him for managing to reconcile European military doctrine with Brazilian reality. Marcelo Bordim defined the Death Column as a force of "excellent mobility and high morale". Domingos Meirelles defined Cabanas as one of the "most brilliant and combative officers" among the São Paulo revolutionaries.

Cabanas' account received criticism for its immodesty and exaggeration. Lieutenant César Honório de Campos, one of the main officers, received only one mention in the book. Anita Leocádia Prestes, daughter of Luís Carlos Prestes, heard from him that Cabanas did not tell the truth and was vain. On the other hand, Davino Francisco dos Santos, author of A Coluna Miguel Costa e não Coluna Prestes, accused Prestes and his daughter of injustice against Cabanas. The two leaders, Prestes and Cabanas, had strong and incompatible personalities.
