= São Paulo Revolt of 1924 in the interior =

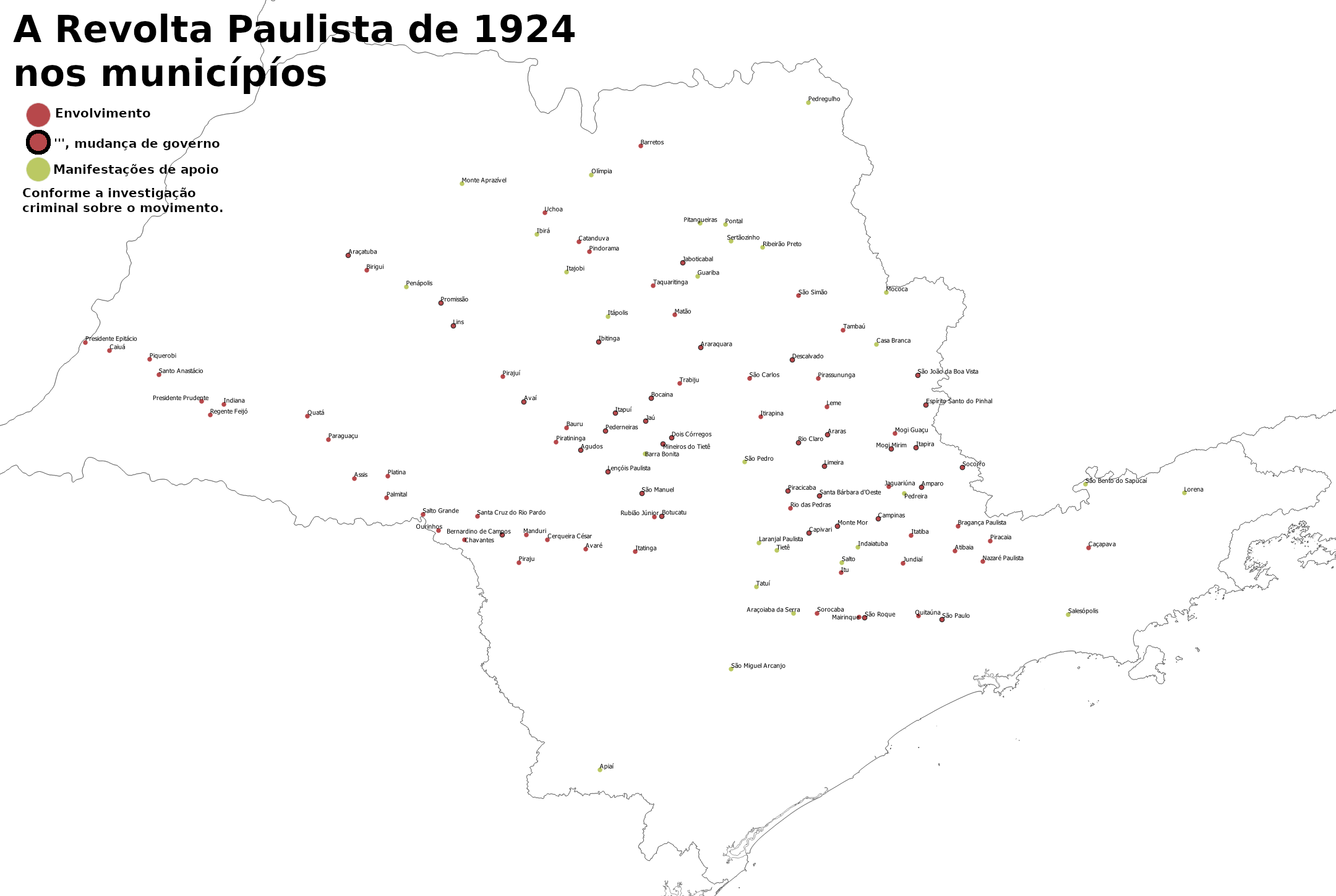
São Paulo municipalities with records of revolt or support for the revolt

The interior of São Paulo was the scene of the São Paulo Revolt of 1924 from July, parallel to the battle for the city of São Paulo, until August and September, when the rebels left the capital and headed for the state border, first to the south of Mato Grosso and then to Paraná. There is record of revolt in 87 municipalities and support for the revolt in another 32. Local political factions joined one side or the other in the conflict, the impact of which was felt even in municipalities never traversed by the revolutionary army.

Municipal political leaders were aligned with the Republican Party of São Paulo and tended to be against the revolt, even mobilizing their voters in patriotic battalions to defend the cause of the state and federal governments. The center of state power was occupied by the rebels, and local dissidents found opportunities to seize power and install governments favorable to the revolt, either on their own initiative or allied with the rebels. Regardless of the side, the city halls needed to deal with a climate of disorder and accommodate hundreds of thousands of refugees from the capital. On 9 July, the rebels controlled Itu, Jundiaí and Rio Claro, taken by local units of the Brazilian Army, and Campinas, one of the most important cities in the state. The government had firm, from the beginning, the connection with Paraná, from Itararé to Itapetininga, the Paraíba valley and the Baixada Santista.

Three loyalist brigades came from Paraná, Mato Grosso and Minas Gerais to besiege the capital; against them the rebels sent three detachments. The Minas Gerais brigade was defeated on the Mogiana Railway by João Cabanas' "Death Column". The Mato Grosso brigade took too long to move, allowing the rebels to capture Bauru, a crucial railway junction. 300 soldiers of the Public Force of São Paulo who could have defended Bauru had been sent away by their commander on 10 July, after the state government withdrew from the Campos Elíseos Palace. The loyalist offensive was only successful on the Sorocabana Railway, where the "Southern Column" won the battles of Pantojo and Mairinque. It was already about to cut the only rail link from São Paulo to Campinas when the revolutionary command left the city with all of its army on the night of 27 July. Therefore, this campaign in the interior was fundamental for the outcome of the fight in the capital.

The withdrawal went in the direction of the Paraná River, on the border with Mato Grosso. As the railway connection through Três Lagoas was occupied, the rebels turned around Botucatu and headed to Presidente Epitácio, which was reached by the vanguard on 6 August. Along the entire route, the loyalists of the Southern Column, commanded by general Azevedo Costa, followed in their wake, fighting several battles. From Botucatu onwards, the rearguard of the rebels was defended by the Death Column, which destroyed the railway infrastructure to slow down the enemy. In the forefront, a rebel battalion entered Mato Grosso, where it was defeated in the battle of Três Lagoas on 18 August. There remained the option of going down the river and settling in western Paraná. On 10 September, all the rebels had already left Presidente Epitácio, but the descent of the river was slow, and it was not until October that all of them reached Paraná, where the campaign lasted until 1925.

== Repercussion of the revolt ==
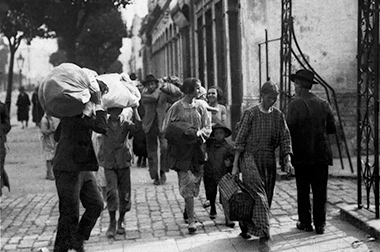
War refugees in the city of São Paulo

On 5 July, the first news of the revolt in São Paulo reached the countryside by telephone. The rebellion was accompanied with uproar and many rumours. Rail connections to the capital were interrupted, and when they returned on the 12th, they were irregular and risky. Raw materials and food stopped flowing into the city. Municipalities depended on the central power in the capital, and were left destitute by their occupation by the rebels led by general Isidoro Dias Lopes. Up to 250 of the capital's 700 thousand inhabitants fled to its suburbs or inland municipalities, fleeing the intense artillery bombardment that began on the 11th. The refugees arrived mainly by train in municipalities such as Campinas, Jundiaí, Itu, Rio Claro and even as far away as Bauru. Rich families preferred to retire to their farms or to Santos.

The sudden population growth created supply problems in the interior municipalities. Campinas, the main refugee destination, had 25,000 people as of 17 July, and may have received as many as 100,000. According to a report by the Catholic Relief Commission:

In two days all the hotels and inns were crowded. Meanwhile, the fugitives continued to arrive in large waves, almost entirely without resources and many with only the clothes on their backs. The city overflowed. Not only hotels but private houses were full of patients, friends or acquaintances of their owners. People slept out in the open and cars served as dormitories! The situation was pressing and extremely distressing. And the fugitives continued to arrive in incalculable numbers, making the situation more and more desperate.

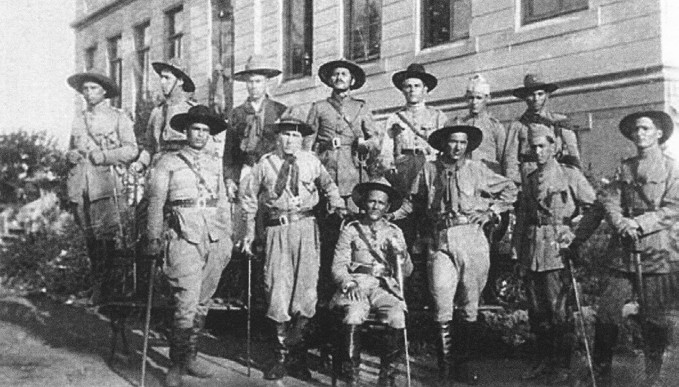
Army reinforcements in Itapetininga

The revolt itself, although focused on the capital, spread inland. Inland towns supported the movement from the start. There is a record of revolt in 87 municipalities in São Paulo and manifestations of support in another 32. Controlling the interior was not in the plans of the initiators of the uprising; their objective was to capture São Paulo immediately and proceed to Rio de Janeiro to overthrow the federal government. All that was needed was for the military units in the interior to join the movement. But this plan fell apart, the march to Rio de Janeiro did not take place, and the need arose to expand the territory inland, guaranteeing a possible escape route in the rear. The new territories were used to enlist volunteers and requisition money and materials.

== Local participation ==
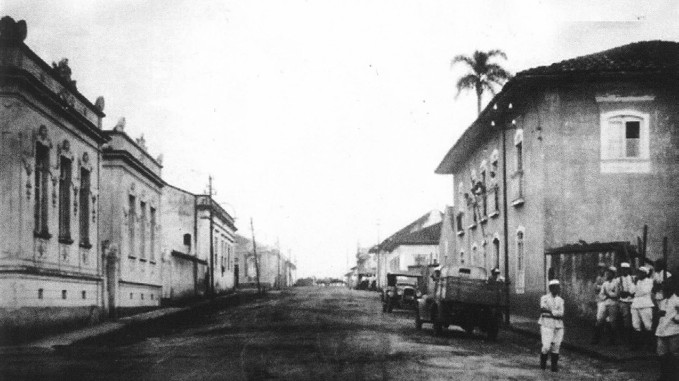
Colonel Fernando Prestes de Albuquerque's mansion, center of the loyalist war effort in Itapetininga

By extending their influence into the countryside, revolutionaries associated with local opposition and splinter groups. Notwithstanding the rebels' originally intended non-involvement in municipal politics, 35 municipalities had revolutionary governments, either by joining or replacing mayors and delegates. "Municipal governors", "military governors" and new delegates were appointed. But the revolution even impacted places never visited by the rebel troops, and in 21 municipalities it started on the initiative of civilians.

In the political scenario of each municipality, situationists and oppositionists chose between joining the revolt, trying to be apolitical or remaining loyal to the federal government of president Artur Bernardes. The tendency was for political leaders to be loyal to legality, that is, to state president Carlos de Campos and the Republican Party of São Paulo. But the revolt opened a great opportunity for local political dissent, which also took advantage of the weakness of many mayors since the disputed municipal elections of 1922. Political leaders tried to unite in defense of their common interest, the maintenance of order, but their ability to control dissent was weakened. The population in several places expressed support for the rebel movement, and the atmosphere was one of instability and terror.

Changes in government took many forms. Revolutionary military officers could seize power for themselves, as in Jundiaí and Itu, or hand over power to local civilians, who could be idealists and activists or opposition politicians. At other times, dissidents took power on their own. In municipalities like Avaí and Promissão, situationist politicians managed to align themselves with the revolt. In Araras, the period was chaotic, dominated by local dissidents with little connection to the revolt. In São Simão and Bebedouro, far from the revolutionary columns, local dissidents tried, but failed, to overthrow the government.

Amidst the conflict, municipal governments called up reservists and created local guards. Campinas, for example, called for volunteers to be in the policing, controlled the departure of foodstuffs from the municipality, set prices for basic necessities, appointed a coffee purge inspector, hired workers for public cleaning and opened credit. For the population, the situation was confusing. The law did not fully function, São Paulo entered civil war and the federal government implemented a state of emergency. Revolutionaries improvised their means of administering municipalities, sometimes resorting to threats and violence.

Local civilians actively participated on both sides of the conflict. In the name of the revolution, small groups of sergeants and civilian allies took over Town Halls, police stations, Recruitment Offices, telephone centers and railway and telegraph stations. Also noteworthy is the contribution of railway workers to the logistics of the rebels. Loyalist colonels raised patriotic battalions, private armies recruited from among their constituencies, as was common practice during elections. Its armament was similar to that of the Brazilian Army, but the level of instruction was not comparable. The rebel lieutenant João Cabanas, who reinforced his column with volunteers and prisoners, referred to both his fighters and the loyalist irregulars as "bandoliers", as the troop composition was the same.

== Campaigns in July ==
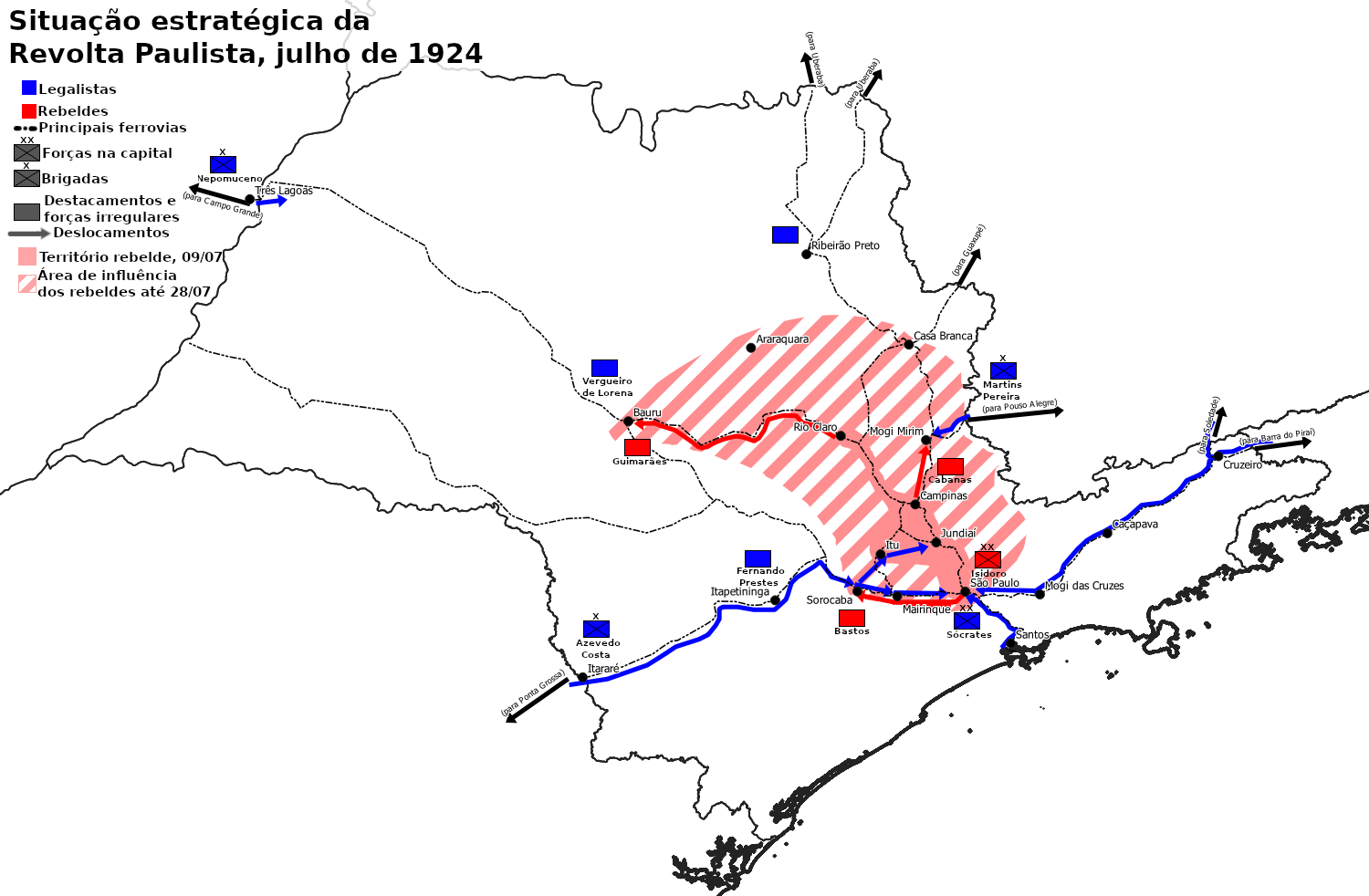
Strategic situation of the uprising in July

The Paraíba valley, the Itararé branch on the border with Paraná, and the Baixada Santista were under government control from the earliest days. The rebels' control, on 9 July, reached Jundiaí, Itu and Rio Claro, occupied by local Army units before their displacements to the capital. (Note: On 6 July, the 2nd Group of Mountain Artillery, from Jundiaí, and until the 9th, the 4th Regiment of Mounted Artillery, from Itu, and the 5th Battalion of Caçadores, from Rio Claro. The 6th Infantry Regiment, from Caçapava, and a company of the 5th Infantry Regiment, from Lorena also joined when they arrived in the town (Meirelles 2002, p. 90, Castro 2022, p. 52-53, 56-57).) (Note: In Rio Claro, for example, before heading to São Paulo to join the rebels, the 5th Battalion of Caçadores deposed the mayor and the City Council and appointed a provisional government. See "5 de julho – A história que rio claro apagou: Quartel do Mercado Municipal foi fechado porque soldados em rebelião tomaram a cidade em 1924". Diário do Rio Claro. 9 July 2022.) When leaving, these units left behind fractions of army troops with which new fronts would be opened.

In Campinas, the head of the municipal opposition, Álvaro Ribeiro, was sworn in at City Hall on 10 July. The police detachment had gone to São Paulo, and since 6 July the only security force was the local recruitment office, whose commander followed orders of the revolutionaries. Campinas was a strategic city, with a privileged topographical position, large income from coffee growing and the largest railway junction in the state, controlling access to the interior. The jurisdiction of Álvaro Ribeiro, "Governor of Campinas", was increased on 15 July by the "Provisional Government" of general Isidoro, with authorization to intervene in other municipalities. He and the mayor of Jundiaí were the only civilians with the authority to make requisitions.

The loyalist command organized three regular brigades (from the Army and the Public Forces) to besiege the city, cutting off access to the interior. They would come from Paraná, Mato Grosso and Minas Gerais, respectively commanded by generals Azevedo Costa, João Nepomuceno da Costa and Martins Pereira. The revolutionary command reacted on 17–19 July by sending three columns into the interior, under the command of Public Force captain Francisco Bastos on the Sorocabana Railway, Public Force lieutenant João Cabanas on the Mogiana Railway, and army captain Otávio Muniz Guimarães, on the Paulista and Noroeste Railroads. Revolutionary expansion inland consolidated the triangle between São Paulo, Campinas and Sorocaba, as well as a cone towards Bauru and Araraquara.

=== First loyalist areas ===
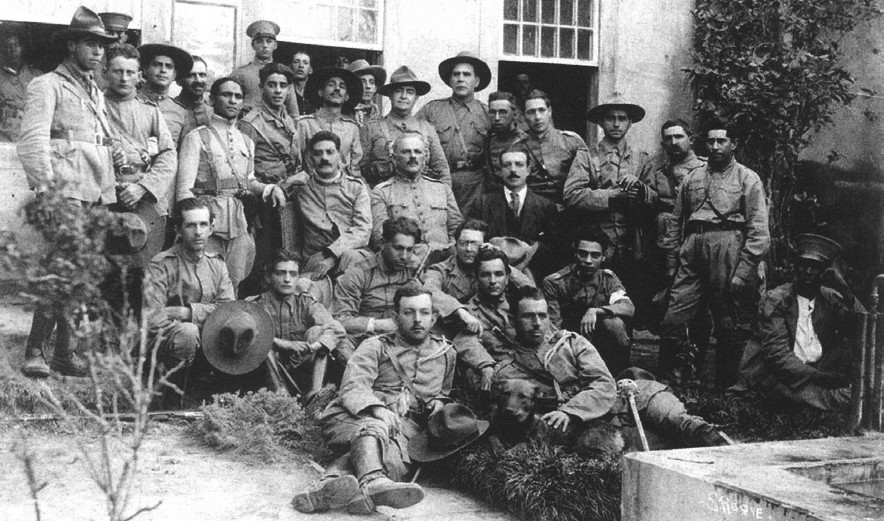
Officership of the patriotic battalions of Itapetininga with Júlio Prestes (wearing a suit)

The Paraíba valley in São Paulo, in the rebels' plan, would have already been crossed on the night of 5 July, and the rebel troops would have gathered in Barra do Piraí, already in Rio de Janeiro territory. This move was canceled due to unexpected loyalist resistance within São Paulo. At 13:00 on 5 July, loyalist regiments from Minas Gerais were already in marching order for the Paraíba valley, which was quickly closed to rebel movement. On 7 July, general Eduardo Sócrates, commander of the loyalist division sent against São Paulo, gathered his staff in Barra do Piraí. Then, he established his headquarters in Caçapava and a command post in Mogi das Cruzes, and finally, the headquarters in Mogi and the command post in Guaiaúna, in the east of São Paulo.

In Itapetininga, on the way to Paraná, local colonels were the first to organize resistance. Fernando Prestes de Albuquerque, vice president of São Paulo, gathered other politicians such as Júlio Prestes, Washington Luís and Ataliba Leonel in his house. They mobilized police and "patriots" from Itapetininga, Sorocaba, São Roque, Avaré and other cities. The irregulars were organized into a Group of Battalions of Caçadores, with three Patriotic Battalions of Caçadores, named according to their patrons: 1st ("Fernando Prestes"), 2nd ("Ataliba Leonel") and 3rd ("Washington Luís"). A 4th ("Júlio Prestes"), in the process of being organized in Itapetininga, was never completed. On 8 July, the Fernando Prestes battalion was already formed in Sorocaba, and the following day, the Ataliba Leonel and Fernando Prestes battalions; on the 10th, they moved to Itapetininga.

The rebels had plans for an uprising in Santos, and sent telegrams with orders to captain lieutenant Soares de Pina, commander of the School of Marine Apprentices and Naval Shooting in Santos, and to lieutenant Luis Braga Mury, of the 3rd Group of Coastal Artillery from the Itaipu Fort, both in Baixada Santista. The telegrams were intercepted, and the leaders of the uprising arrested before they even received them. The arrival of the Navy consolidated the government's position in the city. On 6 July, a naval task force headed by the battleship Minas Geraes docked and disembarked a contingent of sailors, who proceeded to São Paulo. Rear admiral José Maria Penido, commander of the task force, was named civil and military governor of the city. A representative of the Public Supply Commission of São Paulo went down the mountain to buy food, but the admiral's response was: "I will not let a grain of rice go up to São Paulo".

=== Mogiana Railway ===
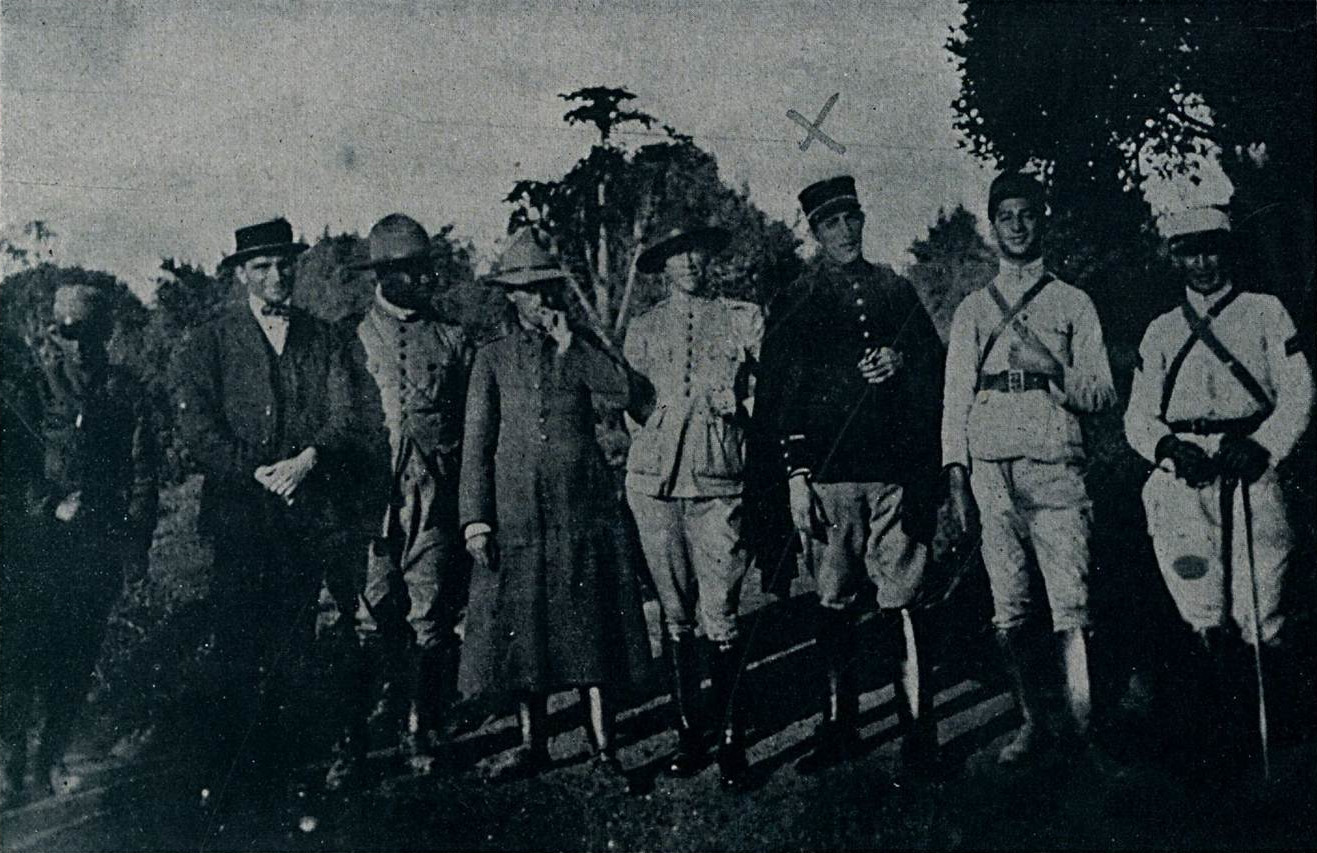
João Cabanas and his General Staff in Amparo

On 19 July lieutenant João Cabanas left north of Campinas with 95 soldiers. Against him, irregulars and police from the Pirassununga and Ribeirão Preto region, led by deputy Fernando de Sousa Costa, converged in Mogi Mirim, north of Campinas, waiting for general Martins Pereira. The loyalist regulars — São Paulo police and reinforcements from Pouso Alegre — numbered no more than 800. The first to arrive from Minas Gerais were the Amaral contingent or battalion of the Public Force of Minas Gerais. Later (21 July), the main component of this force, the 5th Infantry Battalion from Minas Gerais, arrived in Ouro Fino with 350 men. The Army contributed a battery from the 2nd Mounted Artillery Regiment and a platoon from the 1st Divisional Cavalry Regiment. (Note: Santos 2013, p. 33; 44-45, describes the forces from the São Paulo perspective, but ignores the Amaral contingent and includes the 5th Infantry Battalion as the force faced by Cabanas in Mogi. Andrade 1976, p. 60, 68-69 and 85-86, clarifies the situation from the Minas Gerais point of view, quantifying the 5th Infantry Battalion, dating its arrival and specifying the presence of the Amaral contingent.)

Despite his numerical advantage, the loyalist commander dispersed his forces too much and acted passively, suffering several defeats to a small but experienced and well-motivated troop. Cabanas kept his force focused and in constant motion and did his best to mislead his opponent as to his direction and manpower. For his ruses, such as telegrams with false information and trains decorated with fake cannons and machine guns, he is considered a pioneer in psychological warfare in Brazil. A myth arose around the figures of João Cabanas and his "Death Column", as the contingent became known during this period. Cabanas became well known among fighters and civilians and had repercussions in the press, gaining a reputation among government supporters as a truculent leader, accused of many crimes.

According to Cabanas' account, right at the beginning he telephoned Ribeirão Preto saying he had a thousand men on the way. On 20 July he conquered Jaguariúna and, instead of taking the road to Mogi Mirim, he went east to Amparo and Itapira on the 21st. After convincing the loyalists that he would attack from the east, he returned to Jaguariúna and invaded Mogi Mirim from the south. Disoriented, the loyalists retreated on the 23rd. After the revolutionary convoy headed north towards Casa Branca, the irregulars present in Ribeirão Preto dispersed. On the 24th, he repelled a loyalist platoon coming from Eleutério, and on the 26th, he took Espírito Santo do Pinhal by storm. Consequently, general Martins Pereira was unable to take Campinas and isolate the revolutionaries in the capital.

=== Paulista Railway ===
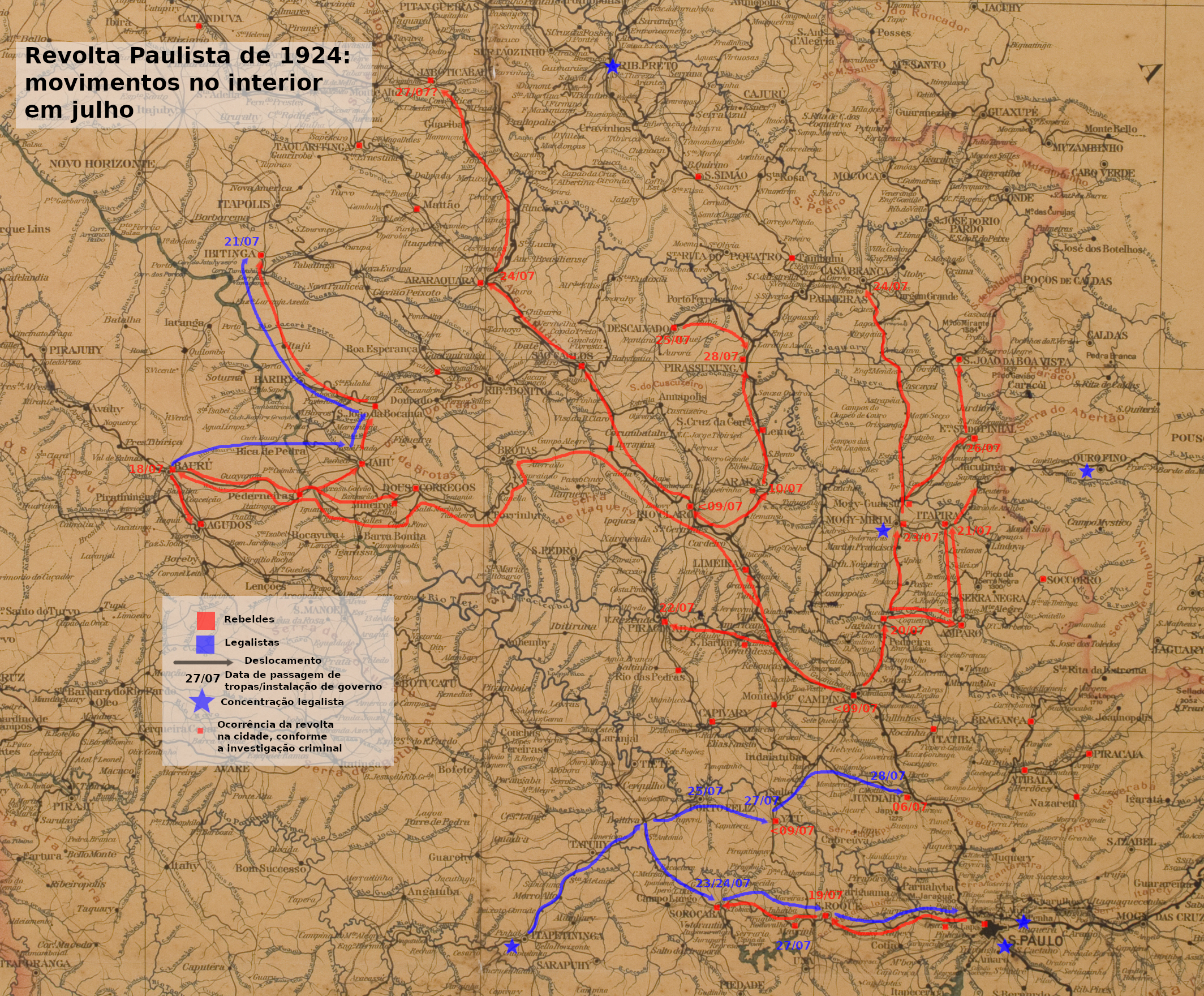
Operations in the region from São Paulo to Bauru

The greatest revolutionary authority on the Paulista and Noroeste Railways was captain Guimarães, but the groups of lieutenant Virgílio Ribeiro dos Santos and several sergeants also acted. Virgílio, commander of the Rio Claro police detachment, returned to the city days after leaving for the capital. From Rio Claro and Campinas, the revolutionaries occupied the municipalities of Piracicaba, Limeira, São Carlos, Araraquara, Araras, Pirassununga, Descalvado and Jaboticabal.

In Araras, local civilians installed a revolutionary government on 10 July. Piracicaba had its new government installed on the 22nd. The revolutionary government in Jaboticabal allowed the passage of a group of rebels, from the 27th to the 29th, to confiscate the weapons of the local army recruitment office. Araraquara was captured by lieutenant Virgílio with about 50 soldiers from the Army and the Public Force; the mayor left the city on the 24th and a new local government was appointed.

In Pirassununga, the 2nd Divisional Cavalry Regiment, based in the city, was loyalist, but after its departure for the capital, only a small force was left to defend the barracks. The city was captured on the 28th (Note: Castro 2022 cites the dates of 20, 23 and 28 as attacks on Pirassununga. The Correio Paulistano issue of 6 August 1924 specifies that the assault on the police station and regimental barracks and the removal of the government took place on the 28th.) by lawyer Francisco Octaviano da Silveira and sergeants Domingos Teixeira de Barros and Benedicto de Paula, who gathered forces from Descalvado (the city taken on the 25th) and Araras. After taking Pirassununga, the sergeants and civilians offered Leme's detachment to join the revolution, but without success.

=== Bauru ===
Captain Guimarães left for Bauru without troops; his men were recruited in the cities along the way. Still, this improvised force managed to occupy the city on 18 July. (Note: 19 July, according to Castro 2022, p. 173.) There was no grueling fighting on this axis. Bauru had been abandoned by the 300 loyalists from the Public Force, who had gathered there on 10 July. Its defenders had been dispersed by major Januário Rocco, from the School Corps, and captain Salvador Moya, from the 3rd Infantry Battalion, after the news of the abandonment of the capital by the state government, and unfounded rumors of the arrival of revolutionaries. Deputy Eduardo Vergueiro de Lorena did not believe the rumors and turned his patriots into a small motorized company ("flying column"), but he was unable to retake the city and went to the north bank of the Tietê river, operating west of Araraquara. The abandonment of Bauru and its capture by captain Guimarães, maintaining access to the west of São Paulo, were crucial for the future of the revolt. Bauru had a strong local opposition, willing to support the revolutionaries, and a convergence of three railroads, thus being an almost obligatory passage to Mato Grosso, where they hoped to obtain support.

Vergueiro de Lorena went to Jaú, trying to cut the path between São Paulo and Bauru; his detachments would destroy the ferry on the Tietê River, between Jaú and Pederneiras, and the Paulista bridge over the Tietê, but he was unable to carry out this plan. Captain Guimarães' revolutionaries, returning from Bauru, passed through Jaú and found the "flying column" on the Jacaré river, in Bocaina, prepared for a fight in the open field. As the revolutionaries did not want to attack, the "flying column" continued to Ibitinga, where it stayed on the 21st; later the rebels also occupied that city. From Bauru they also occupied Agudos and Dois Córregos.

=== Direction of Mato Grosso ===
Loyalist reinforcements from the 4th Military Circumscription, from Mato Grosso, took too long to prevent the fall of Bauru or to threaten captain Guimarães. The rail journey from Campo Grande, from where the forces were concentrated, to Três Lagoas, on the border with São Paulo, took a few hours, but more than 20 days passed from the issue of the order to the arrival at the border. O 29 July, a first force crossed the Paraná River, but it was short of supplies and ammunition. Only in August would they reach Bauru.

Just over 2,000 combatants were deployed in Mato Grosso, at least half of whom were irregulars; colonels were more efficient at recruiting soldiers than the conscription system. However, army commanders did not trust the irregulars. The mobilization was disorganized, the command's decisions had many delays and general Nepomuceno was even accused of ineptitude. Outside the railroads, transport was slow; the units did not have their own trucks and needed private assistance or animal traction.

Officials in Mato Grosso were unhappy and full of supporters of the revolt. Mistrust of the government contributed to the delay in displacement. Lieutenant colonel Ciro Daltro, commander of the 16th Battalion of Caçadores and the Mixed Brigade organized to go to Bauru, may have dragged out the operation, favoring the revolutionaries. There was an attempt to join the revolt in the 17th BC, in Corumbá, and a full revolt in the 10th Independent Cavalry Regiment, in Bela Vista, on 12 July. Other units were detached to attack this regiment, but the revolt was suppressed from the inside out by the unit's sergeants, who remained loyal to the government. With the situation under control, the regiment continued on its way to Três Lagoas on the 23rd. Some revolutionary officers, without troops, managed to abandon the column and join the rebels.

=== Sorocabana Railway ===
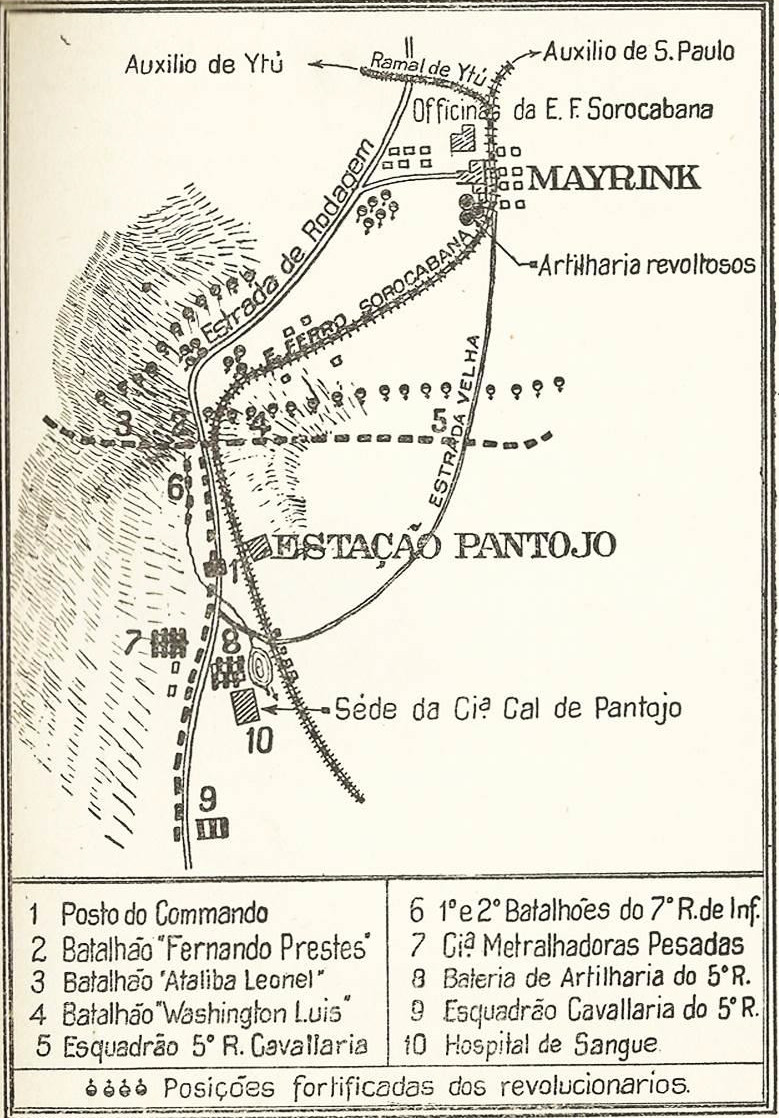
Loyalist and revolutionary positions in Pantojo and Mairinque

Before the arrival of captain Francisco Bastos and his detachment in São Roque, between São Paulo and Sorocaba, about 30 revolutionaries, supported by the local detachment, took over the city on 17 July. A few days later, another group of 80 men would pass through the city. After taking Sorocaba, captain Bastos prepared a defense of position, in a position opposite to that adopted by lieutenant Cabanas in the Mogiana Railway. Thus, the loyalists had time to organize their offensive.

In addition to the patriotic battalions, the loyalists in Itapetininga gathered 300 men from the Public Force of São Paulo. A police battalion came from Paraná, the 13th Infantry Regiment (RI), the 5th Divisional Cavalry Regiment (RCD) and the 3rd Battery of the 5th Mounted Artillery Regiment (RAM); a police battalion from Santa Catarina; and from Rio Grande do Sul, the 7th RI. The officers of the 13th RI sympathized with the revolutionaries.

Azevedo Costa moved the bulk of his column to Boituva and two vanguards: colonel Abreu Lima's left, towards Itu, and colonel Franco Ferreira's right, towards São Paulo via Sorocaba. (Note: The left vanguard had the 13th RI (minus its 6th Company), the Paraná police battalion, a squadron of the 5th RCD, and a company of heavy machine guns from the 7th RI. The right had the patriotic battalions and a squadron of the 5th RCD, reinforced on 27 July by a heavy machine gun section of the 7th RI and the mounted artillery battery. Bulletin No. 57 of 12 September 1924, of the South Operations Column, written by Azevedo Costa and reproduced in Ribeiro 1953, p. 283-284.) Abreu Lima reached Porto Feliz on 25 July and Itu on the 27th, without resistance. Franco Ferreira's detachment entered Sorocaba on 23 or 24 July, without encountering resistance, and arrested the commander of the local Public Force detachment and his 40 soldiers.

The right vanguard met the rebels in Pantojo, before Mairinque, on the 25th. Pantojo was a strategic location: there the Sorocabana Railway converged with the road in the middle of the hills where the rebels took up positions. The fighting lasted two days and two nights. Both sides used artillery in the open field. On 27 July the loyalists finally occupied Mairinque. This axis was the only one with loyalist strategic success: while loyalist cavalry patrols followed from São Roque to the capital on 28 July, the left vanguard continued to Jundiaí, intending to cut off the revolutionaries' access to Campinas. A rebel cavalry squadron passed through Votorantim, it was said to cut the road between Sorocaba and Mairinque, but it surrendered in the town of Una and taken prisoner by the Fernando Prestes battalion.

== Withdrawal from São Paulo ==
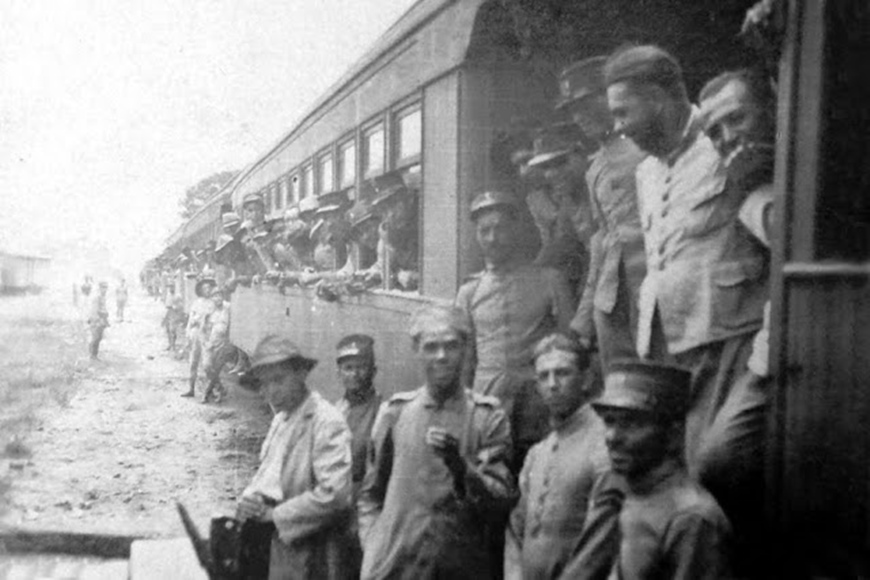
Military transfer by train

On 27 July, the revolutionary command chose to leave the city of São Paulo and head towards Mato Grosso, where they could either continue the rebellion or retire into exile. In the evening the entire revolutionary army, with 3,500 to 6,000 men and abundant supplies, left by train. There were reasons within the capital for this decision—the lack of any chance of success and the brutality of the loyalist bombing. Events in the countryside were also crucial. General Azevedo Costa's "Southern Column" was about to cut off the last exit from the city: at noon on 28 July, its vanguard reached Jundiaí after passing through Itu. A day's difference would have trapped the rebels inside the capital. Thus, it hastened the decision; for the loyalist general Abílio de Noronha, it was the Southern Column "who in fact forced the rebels to withdraw". According to Lourenço Moreira Lima, secretary of the Miguel Costa-Prestes Column, leaving São Paulo was the correct response to the "iron circle" prepared by the government.

As the rebels withdrew and the loyalists regained control, municipal governments who had aligned with the revolt were overthrown.

=== Reorganization in Bauru ===
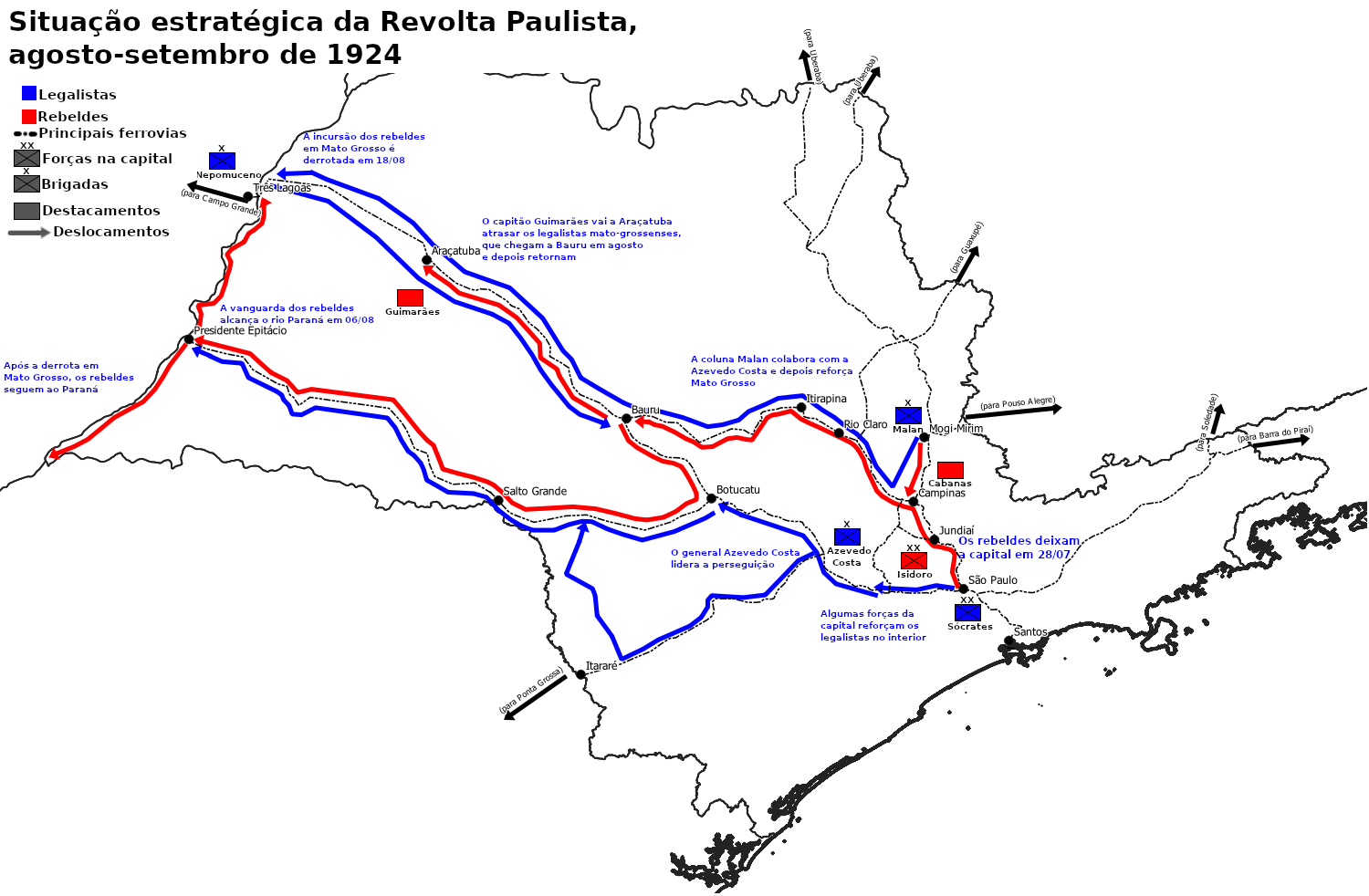
Map of the rebel withdrawal

Due to the loyalist success in the Sorocaba axis, the only available route was through Bauru, where the bulk of the revolutionaries arrived on 28 July, passing through Campinas, Rio Claro and Itirapina. Lieutenant Cabanas' column covered the rear in Mogi Mirim and was one of the last forces to withdraw. The last of the trains coming from the capital entered Itirapina, transfer center of the Paulista Railway, at 07:00 on the 28th, and over the next three days, the cargo was transferred from narrow-gauge to wide-gauge wagons. On 29 July, the troops were reorganized into a cavalry regiment, an artillery regiment and seven battalions of Caçadores, grouped into three brigades. The plan was to continue to Mato Grosso via the Noroeste Railway, entering through Três Lagoas, but that position was already occupied by the loyalists. All that was left was to go around São Manoel and Botucatu and travel along Sorocabana to the border of Mato Grosso.

Order of battle of the revolutionaries in Bauru
General command: Isidoro Dias Lopes

Chief of Staff: lieutenant colonel Antonio Mendes Teixeira
1st Brigade (Bernardo de Araújo Padilha)

- 1st Battalion of Caçadores (captain Olintho Tolentino de Freitas Marques)
- 2nd Battalion of Caçadores (lieutenant (commissioned captain) Luiz de Franca Albuquerque)

2nd Brigade (Olinto Mesquita de Vasconcelos)

- 3rd Battalion of Caçadores (captain (commissioned major) Juarez Távora)
- 4th Battalion of Caçadores (lieutenant (commissioned captain) Nélson de Melo)

3rd Brigade (Miguel Costa) (Note: Consisting only of soldiers of the Public Force of São Paulo.)

- 5th Battalion of Caçadores (lieutenant (commissioned captain) João Cabanas)
- 6th Battalion of Caçadores (captain Coriolano de Almeida Júnior)
- 7th Battalion of Caçadores (lieutenant (commissioned captain) Arlindo de Oliveira)

Cavalry Regiment (general João Francisco)

Mixed Artillery Regiment (lieutenant colonel Newton Estillac Leal)

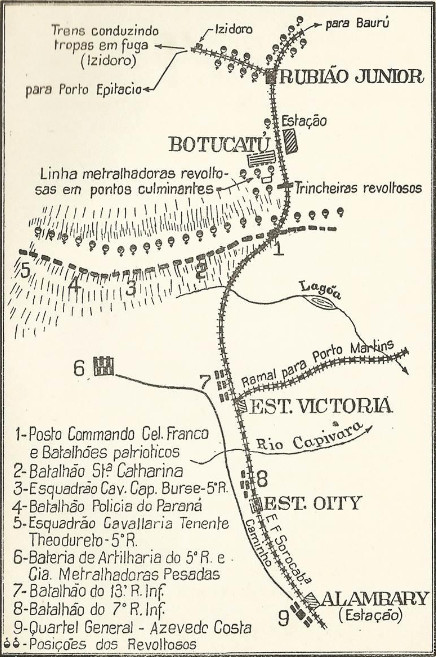
Combat positions in Botucatu

Captain Guimarães, with 150 volunteers, was sent from Bauru to Araçatuba to resist an eventual advance by Mato Grosso loyalists; rebel governments were installed in that city and in Lins and Promissão, along the way. The revolutionaries went further and launched an attack on São José do Rio Preto from Mirassol on the 31st, but were repulsed. The battalions of João Cabanas and Juarez Távora covered the rear of the revolutionaries as they passed through Botucatu; Távora remained in that city, and Cabanas in São Manoel. At the same time, the loyalists moved a detachment from the Southern Column against Bauru, commanded by colonel Trajano and consisting of the 7th RI, two squadrons of the 5th RCD, a battalion from Paraná and a battery of the 5th RAM. The Malan detachment (that is, the former column of general Martins Pereira, coming from Minas Gerais, now with a new commander) was now subordinate to general Azevedo Costa, and covered his flank. The Teles detachment, also placed at his disposal, was tasked with taking Salto Grande.

On 31 July or 1 August the Trajano detachment found the Távora battalion in Botucatu. Six kilometers away, at the Rubião Júnior station, trains carrying the bulk of the revolutionary division were passing by. Ernani Donato cited a force of 800 men in the Távora battalion, including a German and a Hungarian platoon, against 3,000 loyalists armed with artillery. The fighting lasted 40 hours. After the trains passed, the revolutionary battalion also embarked at night, when contact was broken. Loyalists recorded three wounded in the 7th RI and the capture of 54 prisoners. The next day, the last train of the Cabanas battalion, with 113 occupants, was derailed by local authorities in São Manoel and attacked by the vanguard of the Malan column, which seized the trains and took, depending on the sources, 64 or 67 prisoners. Fourteen of the revolutionaries died in combat, at the cost of two killed and nine wounded among loyalists.

In his report, general Azevedo Costa included Botucatu among his victories, but there is a contrary opinion that the combat was a revolutionary victory, as the bulk of the rebel troops passed unscathed. The entire Southern Column was assembled in Botucatu on 3 August. On 5 August, Mato Grosso loyalists were already in Bauru, finding the city empty.

=== Invasion of Mato Grosso ===
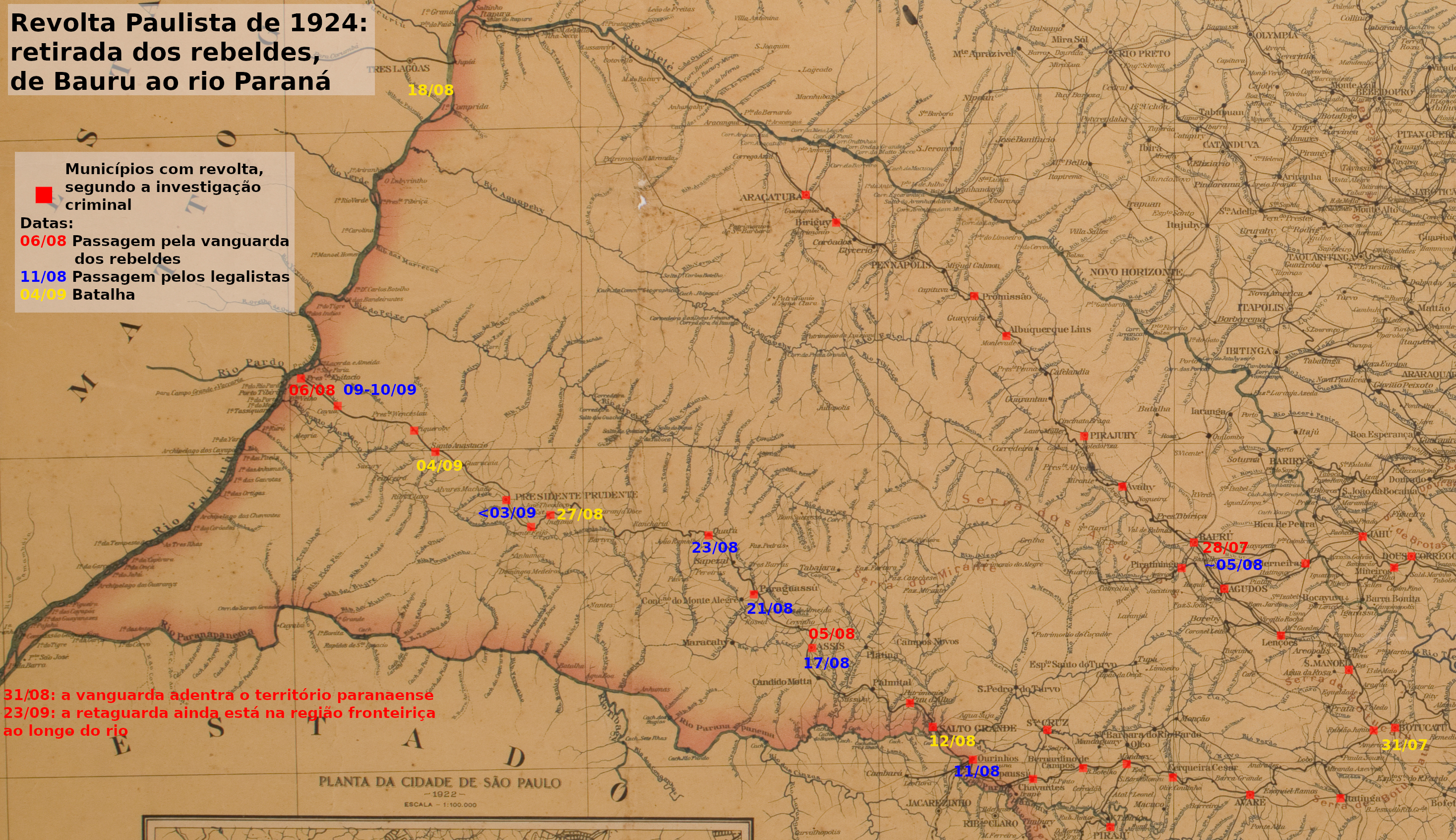
Locations traveled from Bauru to the state border

The revolutionary vanguard was the company of captain Asdrubal Gwyer Azevedo, belonging to the 1st Battalion of Caçadores. After passing through Avaré, Cerqueira César, Ourinhos and Salto Grande, it arrived in Assis on 5 August. In that city, a ceremony was held to commemorate the first month of the rebellion, and the newspaper O Libertador was published. In Presidente Prudente, the local chief of Sorocabana Railway tried to sabotage it, but was stopped by local dissidents. The occupation of the city by the rebels would last a month. The vanguard reached Porto Tibiriçá (currently Presidente Epitácio), on the banks of the Paraná River, on 6 August, seizing the steamers Guairá, Paraná, Rio Pardo, Brilhante and Conde de Frontin and imprisoning a small loyalist contingent. On the same day, the 11th RCI, from Ponta Porã, was sent to the extreme south of Mato Grosso to prevent the revolutionaries from going down the river to Guaíra, on the border with Paraná. Sixty men defended Porto XV de Novembro, on the border with Porto Tibiriçá, but the city was occupied by the rebels.

On the banks of the Paraná, inactivity discouraged the troops. Leaders shared their views on the next step. Colonel João Francisco was against a defensive strategy and preferred to go down the river to the stretch between Guaíra and Foz do Iguaçu and advance to Ponta Grossa by land. From its position in western Paraná, the column would link up with officers committed to the revolution in Rio Grande do Sul. Isidoro preferred to go upriver to Três Lagoas and invade Mato Grosso, where the revolutionaries would proclaim the "Free State of Brasilândia" and would be able to resist and even counterattack.

The information was that Três Lagoas was weakly defended and the other Mato Grosso garrisons could join. In addition to the apparent political and military viability, the plan to invade Mato Grosso would produce more immediate results, and was approved by the officers. But the invasion came too late, and the loyalists were already concentrating supplies and troops in Três Lagoas. Units from Mato Grosso (an artillery battery, the 17th BC, 18th BC and 50th RC) returned from Bauru to defend the ports on the right bank of the Paraná River. The 17th BC was already in Três Lagoas on the 10th. The Malan d'Angrogne column arrived with reinforcements from Minas Gerais, and was already in position on the 16th.

On the morning of 17 August, Juarez Távora landed the invasion force 27 kilometers from the city. It consisted of the 3rd Battalion, reinforced by the Gwyer and Azhaury companies of the 1st Battalion, and an artillery section of captain Filinto Müller, numbering 570 men. The shock troops were made up mainly of foreigners. This invasion force suffered a severe defeat the following day, in the town of Campo Japonês, where it faced the Amaral column, consisting of 145 men from the Public Force of Minas Gerais, and companies from the 12th Infantry Regiment. According to figures from Gazeta de Notícias, the revolutionaries had 24 dead, 23 wounded and 67 prisoners, and the loyalists, 4 dead and 28 wounded. The "Republic of Brasilândia" was frustrated, and the survivors returned to Porto Tibiriçá. For the revolutionaries, the only option left was to go down the river in the other direction and occupy western Paraná. The defeat had one benefit: the loyalists concentrated further north on the border, leaving the road to Paraná less protected.

=== Rearguard actions in the Sorocabana Railway ===
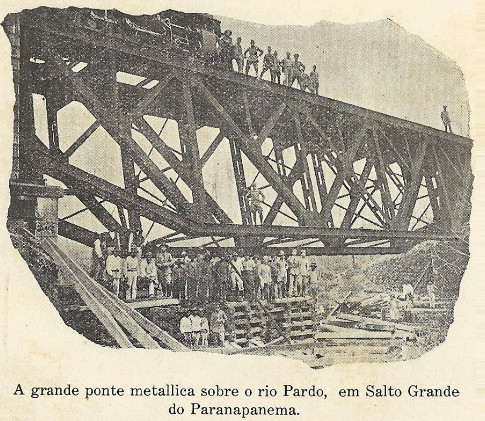
Bridge over the Pardo River, dynamited by the Death Column and restored by the engineers of the Southern Column

While the vanguard reached the Paraná River, the rearguard still had the Southern Column of general Azevedo Costa on its heels. After Botucatu, the defense of the rearguard fell to João Cabanas' "Death Column". There were 42 days of pursuit along approximately 1,200 kilometers of road. To slow down the loyalist movement, this battalion dynamited the railway infrastructure in its path. Loyalists wasted a lot of time rebuilding bridges to allow trains to pass. With the railroad out of order, pursuit forces motorized entire battalions and used back roads, but the troops ended up getting lost. The railroad destruction had military motives, but was controversial; the government press portrayed Cabanas as a vandal. In his account, Cabanas stated that the soldiers of the Military Brigade of Rio Grande do Sul came on trains loaded with alcohol and prostitutes; he defined the loyalist advance as "slack". The vegetation was dry, and along the route, government jagunços set fire to the sides of the roads to make it difficult for the revolutionaries to see.

On 11 August the Southern Column arrived at Ourinhos, and the following day it sent the 12th Infantry Regiment, the 5th RCD and a battery of mountain artillery to attack the Death Column in Salto Grande. The enemy escaped at night in previously prepared trains, and the loyalists could not pursue them, as the bridge over the Pardo River was destroyed. The engineering work only restored the bridge on the 17th, allowing the advance of the bulk of the column to Assis. Azevedo Costa reorganized this force into a cavalry, two infantry, and a mixed brigade.

Organization of the South Column after passing through Salto Grande
Provisional Cavalry Brigade (colonel Franco Ferreira)
- 5th Divisional Cavalry Regiment, Palmital
- 15th Independent Cavalry Regiment, Itararé
- Mountain artillery section, Salto Grande
- Machine gun section of the 13th Infantry Regiment, Salto Grande
- Patriots Cavalry Squadron

1st Infantry Brigade (colonel Trajano)

- 7th Infantry Regiment, Chavantes
- Police Group
  - Paraná Battalion, Salto Grande
  - Santa Catarina Battalion, Salto Grande
  - São Paulo Battalion, Ourinhos

2nd Infantry Brigade (colonel Abreu Lima)

- 13th Infantry Regiment, Salto Grande
- Rio Grande Police Group, Botucatu

3rd Mixed Brigade (colonel Teles) (Note: Disbanded on the 25th. The 11th RI and 15th BC were transferred to the Malan detachment and the batteries of the 1st RAM returned to Rio de Janeiro (Ribeiro 1953, p. 287).)

- 11th Infantry Regiment, Botucatu
- 15th Battalion of Caçadores, Botucatu
- Two batteries of the 1st Mounted Artillery Regiment, Botucatu
- Section of the 1st Heavy Artillery Group, Botucatu

Unassigned troops

- Battery of the 5th Mounted Artillery Regiment, Ourinhos
- Battery of the 1st Mountain Artillery Group, Salto Grande

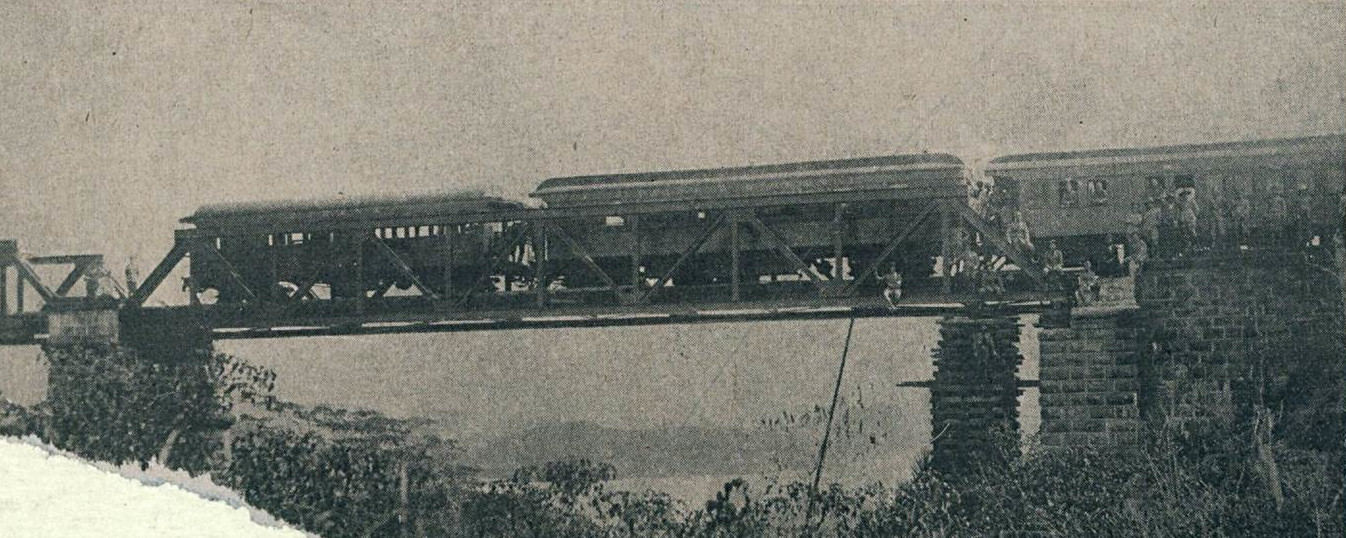
Railway bridge in the interior

The cavalry brigade continued along the highways, and on the 21st it captured a convoy of the revolutionaries in Paraguaçu. On the 23rd, in Quatá, they found disabled locomotives and a fire in the passenger cars and in the sawn wood that was waiting for transport on the side of the road; the vanguard attacked Rancharia but were repulsed. At night the revolutionaries abandoned the station and set fire to the wood. The bulk of the column was again delayed by a destroyed bridge, now on the Capivara River. On the 25th the mixed brigade was disbanded, and most of its forces transferred. The cavalry brigade attacked the Death Column at Indiana on the 27th, with enveloping action: the 5th RCD on the left, irregular cavalry in the center and 15th RCI on the right. Again the revolutionaries escaped at night. According to Azevedo Costa, his enemy had two dead and four wounded. On 31 August, he reorganized his troops into two columns, left and right, and by 3 September, he had established his command post in Presidente Prudente.

Organization of the Southern Column on 31 August
Left Column (colonel Franco Ferreira)
- 5th Divisional Cavalry Regiment (colonel Alfredo Floro Cantalica)
- 7th Infantry Regiment (lieutenant colonel Primo Dias)
- Mountain artillery group (lieutenant Côrrea Lima)
- Heavy machine gun companies:
  - from the 13th Infantry Regiment (lieutenant Euclides Zenóbio da Costa)
  - from the 7th Infantry Regiment (lieutenant Rolim)
- Patriots Cavalry Squadron (captain Onésio Costa)

Right Column (commanded directly by the general)

- 15th Independent Cavalry Regiment
- Police Group (lieutenant colonel Ciro Vidal)
  - Paraná Battalion
  - Santa Catarina Battalion
  - São Paulo Battalion
  - 2nd Patriot Battalion ("Washington Luís")
- Rio Grande Police Group (colonel Lúcio Esteves)
- Mountain artillery group
- Heavy artillery battery

An aviation squadron was incorporated into the Southern Column and flew over Presidente Epitácio on 4–5 September, but did not have the technical conditions for further operations. In Santo Anastácio, a notorious battle took place. The Military Brigade found a well entrenched and positioned enemy and attacked at 16:00 on the 4th. The vanguard was the 2nd Battalion of Caçadores, followed by the Company of Heavy Machine Guns and the 1st Battalion. The fighting ceased during the night, and the revolutionaries took the opportunity to escape by train. The Rio Grande do Sul troops recorded four dead and six wounded on their side and 4 dead, 18 wounded and 13 sick captured in the enemy; Cabanas reported having lost 80 men, between dead, wounded and missing. General Azevedo Costa cited 48 dead, wounded and prisoners in the hands of the loyalists.

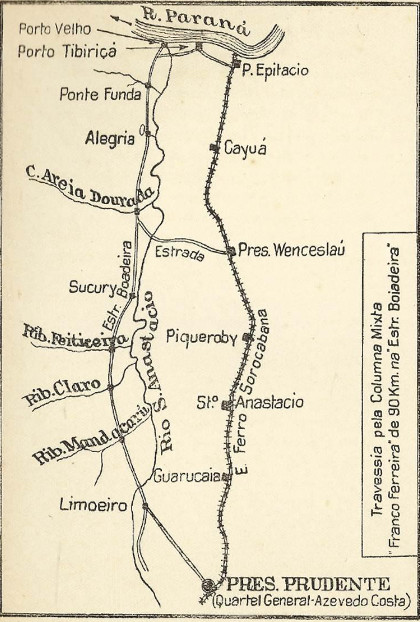
Last stretch of the march, from Presidente Prudente to the banks of Paraná river

=== Descent of the Paraná River ===
On 9 or 10 September, the Southern Column finally reached Porto Tibiriçá. All the revolutionaries had already left the port on their way to Paraná; the vanguard had been moving down the river since 23 August. The revolutionary control in Porto Tibiriçá lasted 37 days. The combatants left behind the towns and coffee plantations of western São Paulo and found a totally new environment. The São Paulo and Mato Grosso banks of the river were sparsely populated, and on the Mato Grosso side there were not even telegraph lines. At first, the government did not even know the whereabouts of the rebels.

The revolutionary vanguard entered Paraná territory on 31 August in the town of São José. On 14 September, it defeated the defenders of Guaíra, headquarters of the Mate Laranjeira Company, enabling the conquest of western Paraná, which was weakly defended. On the 23rd, the vanguard almost reached Foz do Iguaçu, while the rear guard was still between the São Paulo, Paraná and Mato Grosso banks. The journey took a long time, from island to island, with several battles against the loyalists on the Mato Grosso coast. By the end of October, the revolutionaries were already established between the Paraná, Piquiri and Iguaçu rivers.

Another loyalist army, commanded by general Cândido Rondon, faced the rebels around Catanduvas. The campaign in western Paraná dragged on until April 1925, when another column of revolutionaries arrived from Rio Grande do Sul, led by captain Luís Carlos Prestes. Its link with the São Paulo rebels formed the Miguel Costa-Prestes Column, which continued the rebellion.
