= Caiuá (disambiguation) =

Caiuá is a place São Paulo state, Brazil.

Caiuá may also refer to:

- Caiuá Ecological Station, in Paraná state, Brazil
- Caiuá Formation, a geologic formation in Brazil and Paraguay
- Caiuá River, in southern Brazil
