= João Cabanas =

Brazilian politician

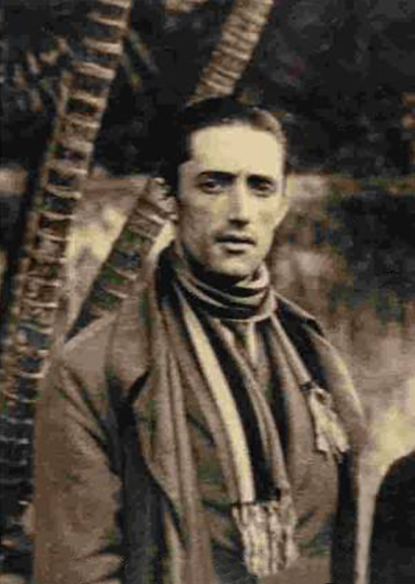
- Cabanas, c. 1928
- Born: 29 June 1895; São Paulo, Brazil
- Died: 27 January 1974 (aged 78); São Paulo, Brazil
- Education: São Paulo Law School
- Spouse: Olga Marduzzo Cabanas
- Military career
- Allegiance: Brazil
- Branch: São Paulo State Public Force
- Rank: Lieutenant colonel
- Conflicts: São Paulo Revolt of 1924; Prestes Column; Revolution of 1930

João Cabanas (29 June 1895 — 27 January 1974) was a Brazilian military officer in the São Paulo State Public Force, currently the São Paulo State Military Police. Cabanas graduated from the São Paulo Public Force Officer School and also graduated with a bachelor's degree of law from the São Paulo Law School.

== Biography ==
External audio
- Cabanas' speech to Brazilian youth on 3 November 1930

Cabanas was born on 29 June 1895 in São Paulo. His parents, Arthur and Balbina Cabañas were Spanish immigrants in Brazil. He began his studies in the Ginásio Pernambucano in Recife and after returning to São Paulo he joined the Law School and the São Paulo Public Force Officer School.

He was one of the main members of the tenentismo movement. As 1st Lieutenant of the Cavalry Regiment of the Public Force, he actively participated in the São Paulo Revolt of 1924 against president Artur Bernardes, commanding the military occupation of the Luz station, acting in the siege of Catanduvas and covering the rear of the Prestes column up to Guaíra. His actions at the head of the column dominated the popular imaginary and were the subject of legends about his person and his military deeds. His column was named the "Death Column". Superhuman powers were attributed to him due to his combat and escaping skills. Because of this, the government put a bounty on his head.

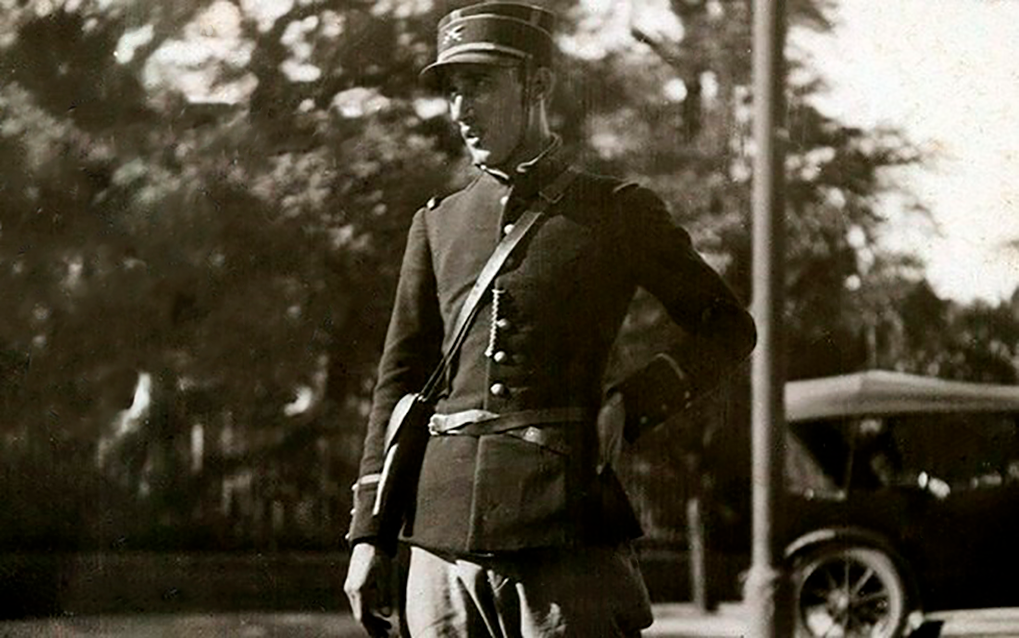
Cabanas in July 1924

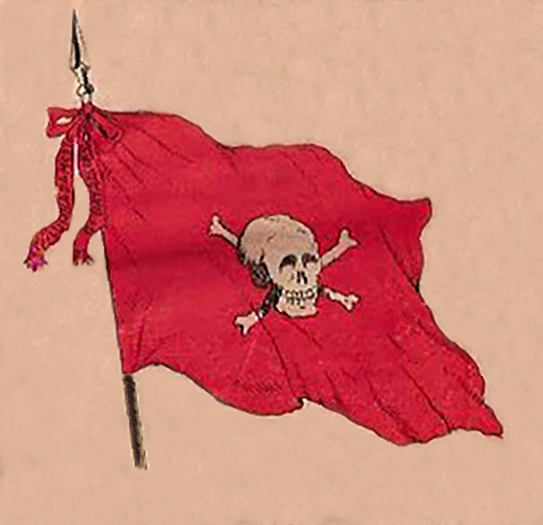
Flag of the Death Column

He went into exile in Uruguay, not following the column. During the Revolution of 1930, he returned to Brazil and joined the forces that put Getúlio Vargas in power. He was the main lieutenant to participate in the ceremony that tied the gaucho's horses in the obelisk on the current Rio Branco avenue, in Rio de Janeiro, which symbolized the triumph of the 1930 revolution over the First Brazilian Republic.

He was disappointed with the direction of Vargas' government and joined the Brazilian Socialist Party. He wrote letters to Vargas, criticizing the coffee policy of the Provisional Government. In February 1932, in his book "The Pharisees of the Revolution", he especially criticized the disastrous state administrations, using as an example João Alberto Lins de Barros, who governed the São Paulo state between 1930 and 1931, drawing attention to the situation in the state just before the outbreak of the 1932 Constitutionalist Revolution:

"João Alberto serves as an example: if, as a military man, he deserves respect, as a public man he does not deserve the slightest compliment. Placed, by inexplicable maneuvers and circumstances not yet clarified, at the head of the most important state in Brazil, he proved to be of an extraordinary, admirable incompetence, creating, in a single year of government, one of the most tragic event that there is memory in the political life of Brazil, also giving rise to a serious economic deadlock (deficit of 100,000 contos), and the deepest unpopularity against the "October Revolution" and having provoked in the people of São Paulo an equivocal and dangerous state of mind. Our history does not record another period of failure as complete as that of Inexperienced Tenentism"!

He supported the 1932 Revolution at the time of the outbreak of its uprising and, although he did not participate in the fighting, was arrested in the Casa de Correição in Rio de Janeiro together with others responsible for the uprising in São Paulo.

In 1935, he was one of the articulators of the Aliança Nacional Libertadora (ANL).

In the late 1940s he participated in the campaign that advocated for the state oil monopoly and the creation of Petrobrás, the so-called O Petróleo é Nosso (The oil is ours) campaign.

He supported Getúlio Vargas' run for the presidency in the 1950 general elections. That same year, he ran for a seat in the Federal Chamber of Deputies, in São Paulo, by the Brazilian Labour Party (PTB), where he got a substitute position, only assuming a federal deputy term in April 1953 and August 1954.

He is considered the first military officer to use psychological warfare in Brazil. He is the author of the books "A Coluna da Morte" (The Death Column), in which he narrates the feats of his column in the interior of São Paulo during the 1924 revolt and "Os Fariseus da Revolução" (The Pharisees of the Revolution), where he criticizes the failures of the 1930 revolution.
