= Ouro Fino =

- Municipality
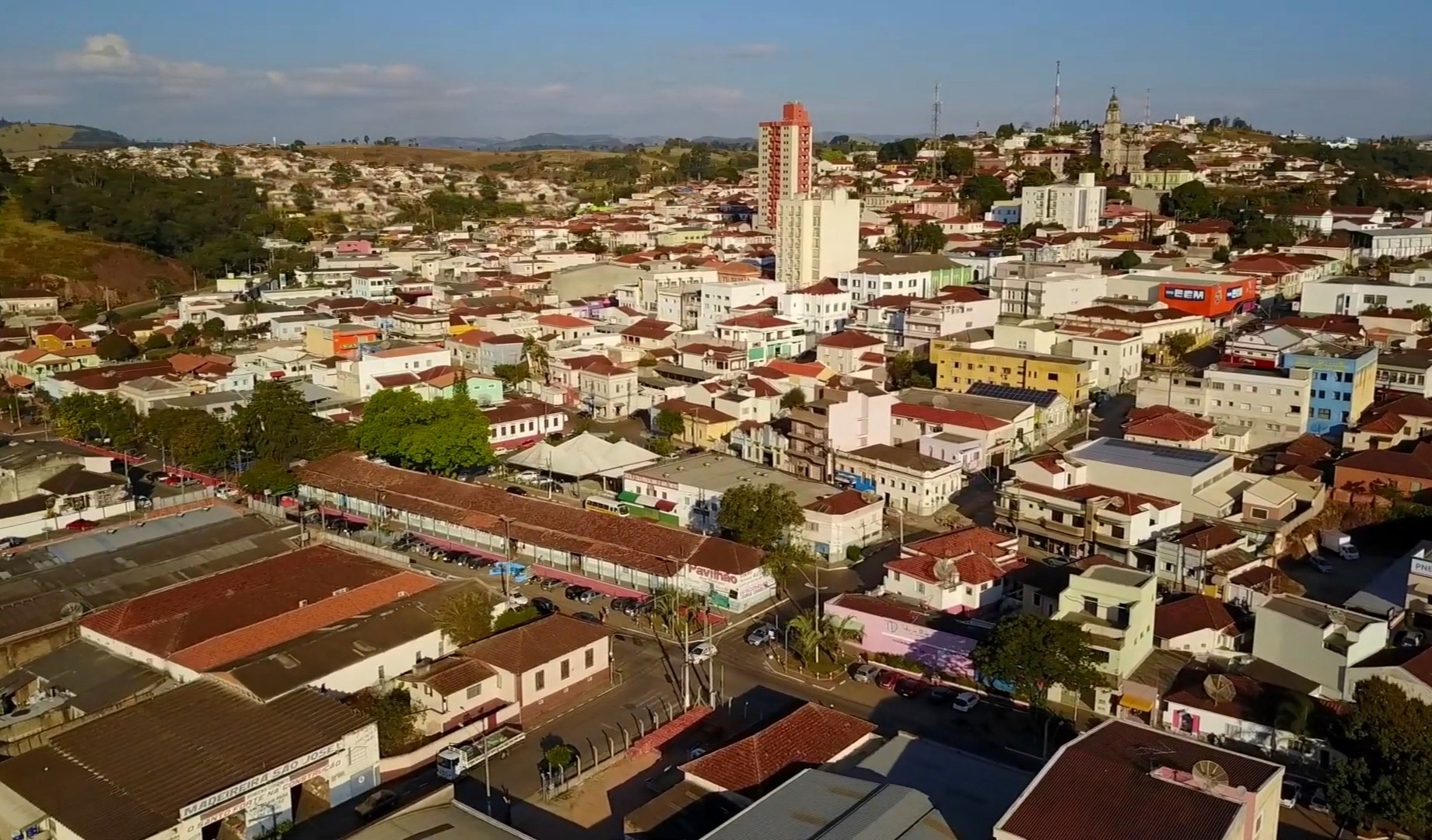

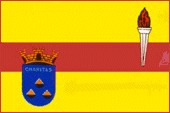
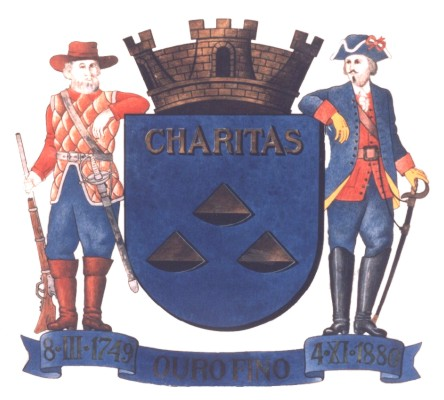
- Flag Coat of arms

- Location in Brazil
- Coordinates: 22°16′58″S 46°22′8″W
- Country: Brazil
- Region: Southeast
- State: Minas Gerais
- Mesoregion: Sul de Minas
- Elevation: 2,979 ft (908 m)

Population (2020)
  - Total: 33,791
  - Density: 153.2/sq mi (59.16/km^{2})
- Time zone: UTC−3 (BRT)
- Postal code: 37570-000
- Area code: 35
- Website: http://www.ourofino.mg.gov.br

Ouro Fino is a city situated in the state of Minas Gerais in the Southeastern Region of Brazil.

== See also ==
- List of municipalities in Minas Gerais
