= Catanduvas, Paraná =

Coordinates: 25°12′10″S 53°09′25″W

- Municipality
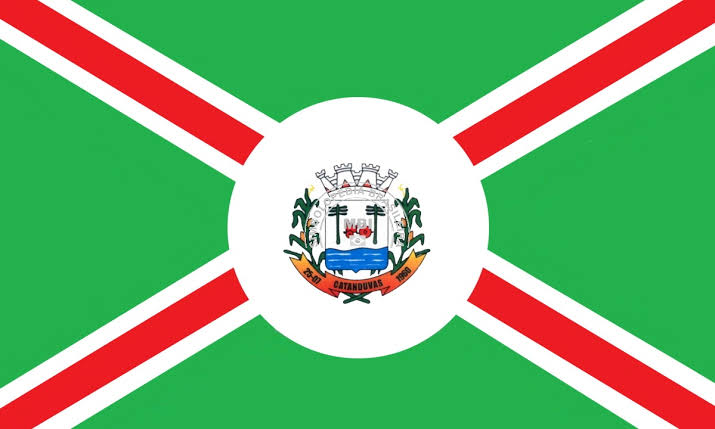
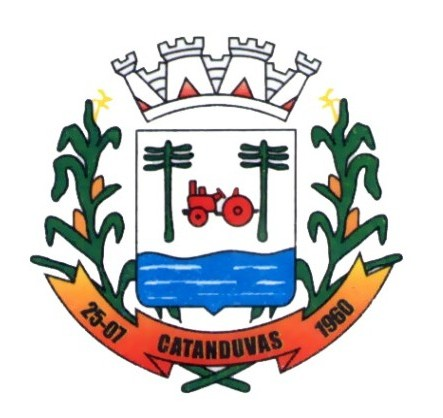
- Flag Coat of arms
- Interactive map of Catanduvas, Paraná
- Country: Brazil
- Region: Southern
- State: Paraná
- Mesoregion: Oeste Paranaense

Population (2020)
  - Total: 10,167
- Time zone: UTC−3 (BRT)

Catanduvas, Paraná is a municipality in the state of Paraná in the Southern Region of Brazil.

== See also ==
- List of municipalities in Paraná
