= Artur Bernardes =

President of Brazil from 1922 to 1926

His Excellency Artur Bernardes GOC
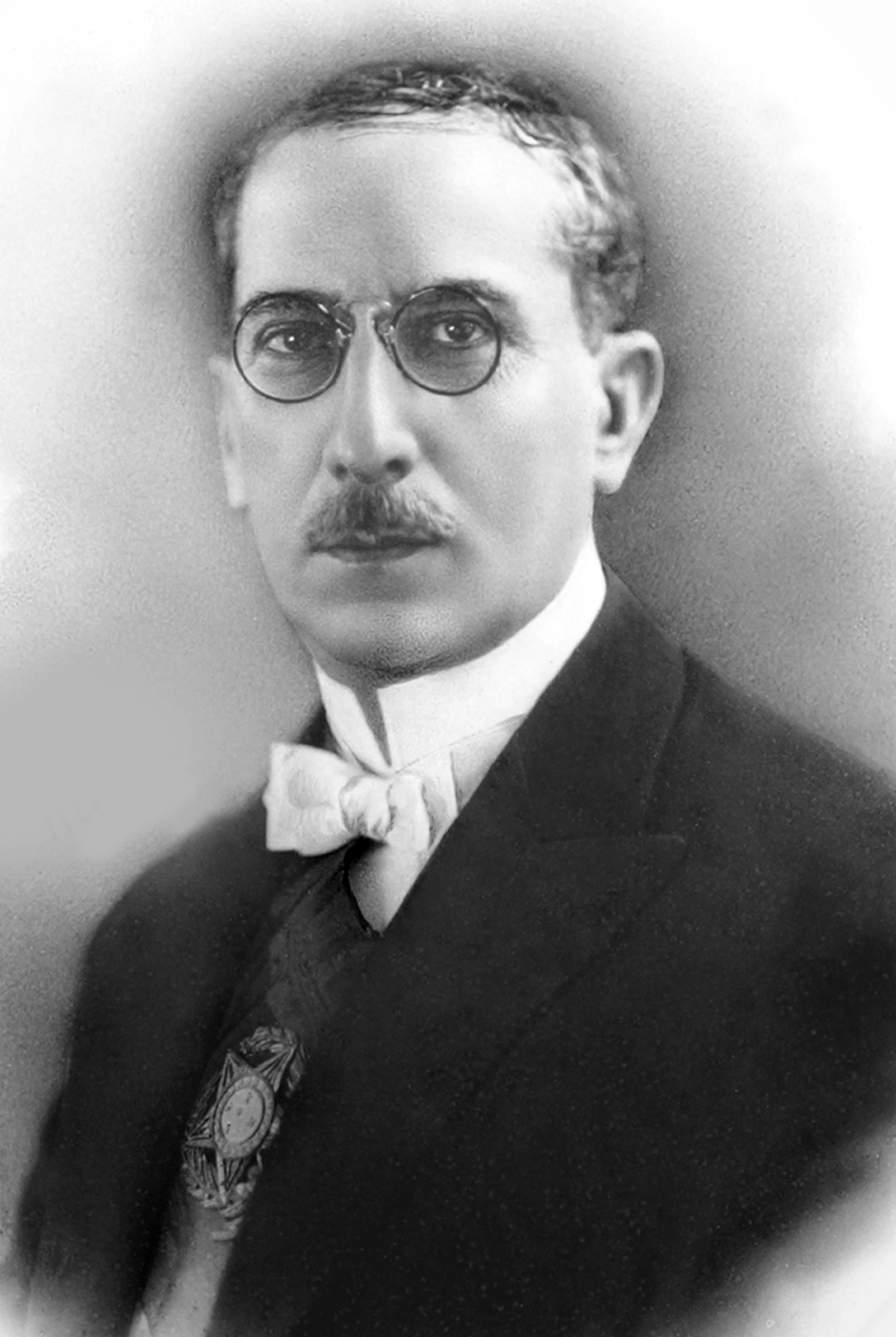
- Official portrait, 1922

12th President of Brazil
- In office 15 November 1922 – 15 November 1926
- Vice President: Estácio Coimbra
- Preceded by: Epitácio Pessoa
- Succeeded by: Washington Luís
Executive offices
1918–1922	President of Minas Gerais
1910–1914	Secretary of Finance of Minas Gerais
1906–1906	Mayor of Viçosa
Legislative offices
1952–1953	Member, Chamber of Deputies
1951–1951	Member, Chamber of Deputies
1946–1951	Member, Chamber of Deputies
1935–1937	Member, Chamber of Deputies
1927–1930	Member, Federal Senate
1915–1918	Member, Chamber of Deputies
1909–1910	Member, Chamber of Deputies
1907–1909	Member, Legislative Assembly
1906–1906	President, Municipal Chamber
1905–1906	Member, Municipal Chamber

Personal details
- Born: 8 August 1875 Santa Rita do Turvo, Minas Gerais, (Note: Santa Rita do Turvo is the current municipality of Viçosa. The birthplace is disputed by the current municipality of Cipotânea. See #Early life and family.) Empire of Brazil
- Died: 23 March 1955 (aged 79) Rio de Janeiro, Federal District, Brazil
- Cause of death: Myocardial infarction
- Resting place: São João Batista Cemetery
- Party: PRM (c. 1904–1937); UDN (1945); PR (1945–1955)
- Spouse: Clélia Vaz de Melo (m. 1903)
- Children: 8, including Artur Filho
- Education: Faculty of Law of São Paulo (LL.B.)
- Occupation: Lawyer; journalist; landowner

Artur da Silva Bernardes (Note: Portuguese: [aʁˈtuʁ da ˈsiwvɐ beʁˈnaʁdʒis]; In the old spelling, "Arthur da Silva Bernardes".) (8 August 1875 – 23 March 1955) was a Brazilian lawyer and politician who served as the 12th president of Brazil from 1922 to 1926. Bernades' presidency was marked by the crisis of the First Brazilian Republic and the almost uninterrupted duration of a state of emergency. During his long political career, from 1905 until his death, he was the main leader of the Republican Party of Minas Gerais (PRM) from 1918–1922 until the party's closure in 1937, and founder and leader of the Republican Party (PR).

Before his presidency, Bernardes served as president (governor) of Minas Gerais from 1918 to 1922, during which time he founded the current Federal University of Viçosa and prevented American investor Percival Farquhar from exploiting the iron ore deposits in Itabira, cultivating an image of a nationalist and municipalist leader. A status quo and "milk coffee" candidate in the 1922 presidential election, Bernardes was the target of fake letters to harm his image and an attempted coup d'état to prevent his inauguration, the Copacabana Fort revolt. His administration was unpopular in the cities, especially in Rio de Janeiro, and from July 1924 onwards he was attacked by conspiracies and armed uprisings by tenentist rebels.

Bernardes' attitude towards the opposition was uncompromising and authoritarian. Out of the states that opposed his candidacy, Rio de Janeiro and Bahia had their dominant parties overthrown, and Rio Grande do Sul fell into a civil war, the Revolution of 1923, in which the federal government brokered a peace deal. In the capital, the political police were reorganized into the 4th Auxiliary Police Bureau. Hundreds of rebel military personnel and civilians died in the bombing of São Paulo and the penal colony of Clevelândia. No amnesty was granted to the rebels. The government repressed militant workers, especially anarchists, while simultaneously enacting some labor laws.

The administration also applied an economic policy of austerity and monetary contraction, fighting inflation and currency devaluation, withdrew Brazil from the League of Nations, carried out a centralizing constitutional reform, the only one to the Brazilian Constitution of 1891, and brought the State closer to the Catholic Church. After his presidency, Bernardes took part in the Revolutions of 1930 and 1932, and saw the PRM reduced to a minority faction in Minas Gerais. In his last years he participated in the campaign for state monopoly on oil in Brazil. An austere and reserved man, Bernardes was idolized by his followers, the so-called Bernardists, and hated by his enemies.

== Early life and family ==
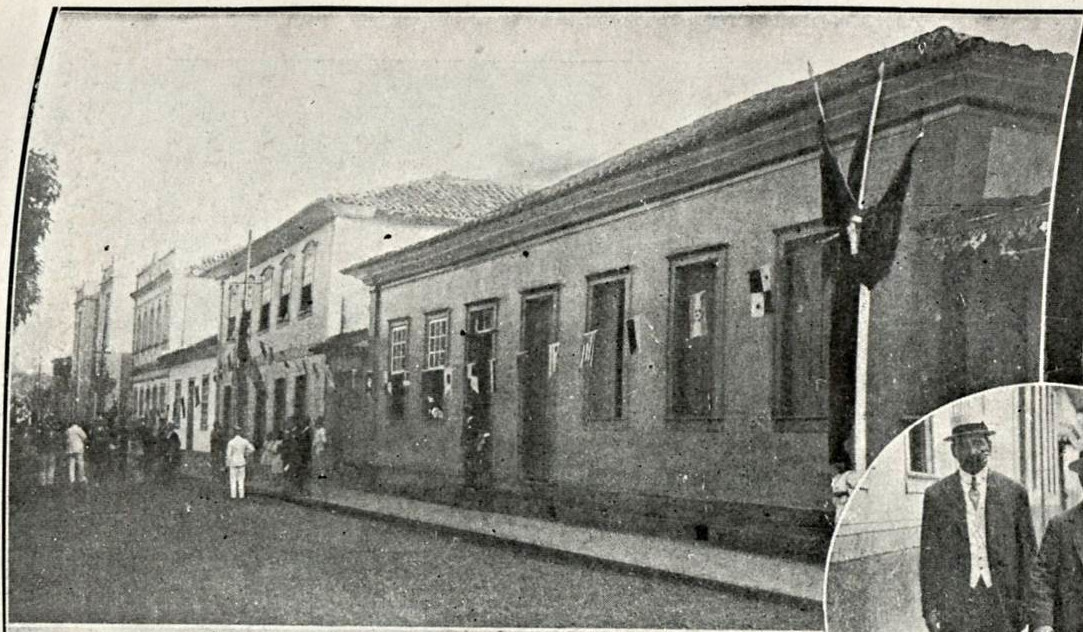
The Bernardes family house in Viçosa

Artur da Silva Bernardes was born on 8 August 1875 in the village of Santa Rita do Turvo, currently the municipality of Viçosa, as recognized in history books. His birthplace is disputed by the municipality of Cipotânea, where it is claimed that the future president was born there, at the time part of Alto Rio Doce, and then moved to Viçosa, an already constituted city, at the age of 5. Bernardes was the fourth of nine children born to Antônio da Silva Bernardes and Maria Aniceta Bernardes. One of his brothers, Olegário, would become justice of the Federal Court of Audits, state deputy in Rio de Janeiro, and mayor of Teresópolis.

Bernardes' mother descended from the Vieira de Sousa family, one of the coffee nobility families of the Zona da Mata, while his father, a Portuguese immigrant from Castanheira de Pera, was a colonel of Brazil's National Guard and lawyer in the districts of Alto Rio Doce, Piranga and Viçosa. In the latter he was the first appointed lawyer and then prosecutor. According to some biographies, Antônio Bernardes did not attend more than primary school in Portugal. The family was wealthy enough to pay for their son's education, but did not belong to the local political group.

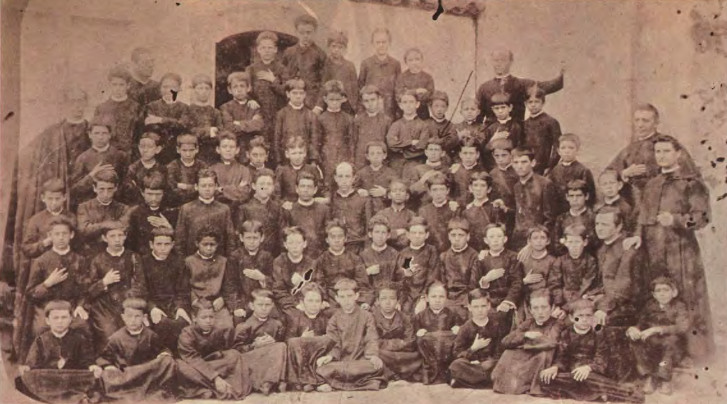
Bernardes (indicated by the arrow) among the students at the Caraça School

Bernardes' strict family education was complemented by the traditional Caraça School, where he was enrolled for secondary studies at the end of 1887, at the age of 12. The Caraça School was one of the most prestigious schools in the country. Gilberto Freyre called it a "sad manor in the mountains". The school's schedule control, restriction of visits, surveillance and punishments left their mark on the children of the Minas Gerais elite. The teachers lived in a cloister and penance and "the paddle passed from class to class, from hall to hall, from playground to playground, leveling everyone with its overwhelming dominance".

This experience allowed Bernardes to "value disciplinary power as a shaper of minds and bodies for the nation", in addition to establishing his Catholic religiosity for the rest of his life, while many of his contemporaries flirted with positivism and evolutionism. A favorable biography at the Historic and Geographic Institute of Minas Gerais, of which Bernardes is the patron of a chair, stated that the teachings at Caraça "had a great influence on his moral, religious and public formation: the zeal for the public cause, the scrupulousness in the distribution of government money, the spirit of discipline, order and austerity". At the other extreme, the anti-Bernardes book Terra Desumana (1926), by Assis Chateaubriand, argued that the school instilled in the young Bernardes an authoritarian personality, making him more interested in laws than in human feelings.

At the end of 1889, Bernardes' family was no longer able to keep him in Caraça due to the impact of the abolition of slavery on Brazil's coffee economy. The solution came from his brother-in-law José da Graça Sousa Pereira, an associate at the firm Pena e Graça, where Bernardes got a job. This firm in the Viçosa district of Coimbra intermediated the coffee trade between producers and exporters, exposing Bernardes to the rural world. This experience continued in his next job at the firm Adriano Teles, in Visconde do Rio Branco, where he reached the position of accountant at the age of 18, in 1894. The position was the highest an employee could reach and gave access to confidential information, proving that Bernardes was a trustworthy employee. His life in Rio Branco exposed him to the issue of modernizing agricultural techniques, as the business group advertised Brazilian products abroad.

=== Law and journalism ===
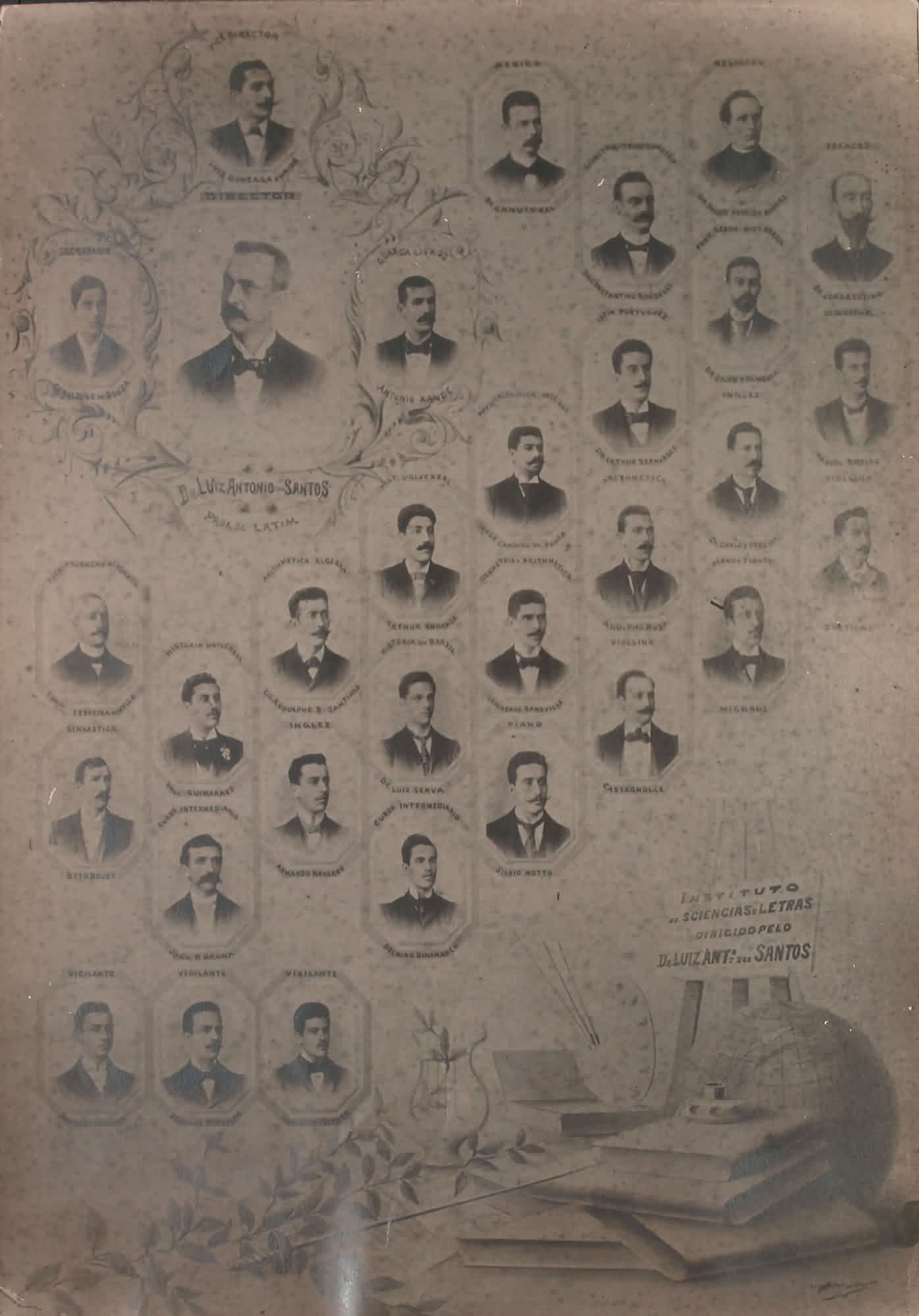
Student body of the Institute of Sciences and Letters in 1899; Bernardes, Portuguese and Latin teacher, is in the fifth column

With his family in a better financial condition, Bernardes was able to enroll in the Externato do Ginásio Mineiro in Ouro Preto at the end of 1894, taking advantage of a decree from the state government that opened separate enrollments. There he studied for preparatory exams (equivalent to a university entrance exam) while living in a boarding house and working at several newspapers and briefly as a Post and Telegraph courier. Under the influence of his father and the Caraça School, Bernardes later enrolled at the Free Faculty of Law, initially as an attendee student, in 1896, before passing the exams and entering the second year in 1897.

As a law student, Bernardes became friends with his colleague and future political ally Raul Soares de Moura, in addition to meeting other figures of future political relevance in Brazil, such as Fernando de Melo Viana and José Vieira Marques. In March, Bernardes volunteered for the Bias Fortes Patriotic Battalion, in the context of the War of Canudos, but the battalion never went out to fight. National politics had a lot of repercussions in Ouro Preto, then the capital of Minas Gerais. Bernardes was among the admirers of Floriano Peixoto, president of Brazil from 1891 to 1894. The anniversary of the abolition of slavery was commemorated with the creation of the newspaper Academia, of which Bernardes was editor.

The following year the Faculty of Law was transferred to Cidade de Minas, currently Belo Horizonte, but Bernardes, Raul Soares and others preferred to be transferred to the Faculty of Law of São Paulo. The new state capital, "where one could smell the clay and fresh paint", could not compare to the comfort of Ouro Preto. São Paulo offered much better opportunities in public life; the only other alternative for the political elite to a degree in Law was the Faculty of Law of Recife. Of the twelve presidents of the First Brazilian Republic, seven had degrees from the Faculty of Law of São Paulo.

In São Paulo, Bernardes worked as editor for the newspaper Correio Paulistano, as member of the Notary's Office of senator Álvaro de Carvalho's father, and as professor of Portuguese and Latin at the Institute of Sciences and Letters of São Paulo. Bernardes and Raul Soares became friends with another native of Minas Gerais at the faculty, Arduíno Bolívar, and possibly joined an academic secret society, the Bucha. During holidays, contact was maintained through letters, and during one of these periods, in 1899, Bernardes gained fame defending a defendant in the Viçosa criminal court. The accuser was his father. Upon receiving his bachelor's degree in Legal and Social Sciences in December 1900, he pursued a career as attorney. Prestigious among his peers, Bernardes was chosen for the graduation speech. After arriving in his native Viçosa, Bernardes was welcomed with a demonstration at the train station and a ball. A bachelor's degree in Law raised his social status. The district had few qualified lawyers, and his professional colleagues had a strong presence in the Brazilian republican state, as they intermediated public and private interests.

At the age of 25, still in 1900, Bernardes opened a law firm in Viçosa. Shortly afterwards, his father resigned from his position as prosecutor to avoid a conflict of interest with his son's career. The next two years were filled with constant travels to neighboring cities. In addition to law, Bernardes started working at the weekly newspaper Cidade de Viçosa, owned by a local political leader, senator Carlos Vaz de Melo, leader of local directories and supporters of the Republican Party of Minas Gerais (PRM), the only one in the state. The PRM represented the interests of southern Minas Gerais and the Zona da Mata, and Viçosa was a municipality with significant agricultural production in the Zona da Mata, although it was not among the largest in the region. Bernardes' interest in politics was visible. Since his academic days, Cidade de Viçosa presented him as a member of the local elite and as representative of bourgeois values, and he published several articles in the newspaper, including an article on the revision of Brazil's 1891 Constitution in 1901.

=== Marriage and children ===
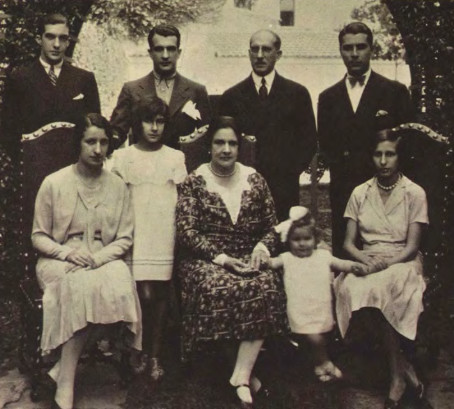
The Bernardes family in 1932: Clélia Bernardes sits in the center, with her husband standing third from left to right

Bernardes' passion for Clélia Vaz de Melo, the daughter of Carlos Vaz de Melo, opened the doors to the political world when the senator authorized their marriage, which took place on 15 July 1903. Artur Bernardes was now his father-in-law's political heir. Bernardes and Clélia had been dating for a decade, but her father did not allow the marriage before the end of the course. The couple had eight children: Clélia, Artur, Maria da Conceição, Dhalia, Rita, Sylvia, Geraldo and Maria de Pompeia. Of these, Artur Bernardes Filho followed his father's career and was a federal deputy, constituent, senator and vice-governor of Minas Gerais, reaching the position of Minister of Industry and Commerce in 1961.

The Vaz de Melo-Bernardes became one of the family groups that dominated, with a certain stability, the zones, regions, electoral districts or municipalities of Minas Gerais. Kinship with at least one other politician can be observed in 51.7% of a sample of 511 Minas Gerais politicians between 1891 and 1930, according to a collective biographical study by Amílcar Vianna Martins Filho. Bernardes was also very typical of the Minas Gerais political class due to his bachelor's degree in Law, shared with 61.6% of the sample. 17.6% had secondary education in Caraça.

The family's rural properties were directly benefited by some of the fiscal, budgetary and tax decisions praised by Cidade de Viçosa, such as the reduction in prices on the Leopoldina Railway. Artur Bernardes appeared in the 1907 Laemmert Almanac as a farmer in the Viçosa region, and throughout his life he was a coffee planter and director-owner of a sugar factory in Ponte Nova. Minas Gerais was an agrarian society, but education and the liberal profession (law) had more direct relationships with the political career.

== Political rise ==
=== City councillor (1904–1907) ===
Bernardes' participation in elections was not immediate, and he refused an offer from his father-in-law to support a candidacy for federal deputy. Instead, Vaz de Melo assigned his son-in-law to welcome the State President (governor) Francisco Sales and other politicians. Bernardes gradually made contacts and demonstrated his rhetoric. In 1904 he ran for special councillor for the Viçosa district of Teixeiras. Despite his previous statements about reforming the Constitution, in October Bernardes claimed in Cidade de Viçosa that he did not want elected positions and only appeared on the PRM ticket at the last minute, "yielding to the orders of friends in the District".

On 19 November, the District's 52 voters unanimously elected him. Carlos Vaz de Melo died three days later, and Bernardes succeeded him as director of Cidade de Viçosa in January, which began covering extra-municipal issues and supporting the councillor's political opinions. On the first day of the year Bernardes published yet another defense of the reform of the Constitution, promising that "this newspaper will be a fierce and merciless fight against the idea, promoted by some, of changing nothing in the fundamental law". This ambition would be realized two decades later, when Bernardes assumed the presidency. The program presented in the article was to enhance the municipalities and defend the interests of farming, commerce and industry. Other articles discussed the issues of local coffee farming and production alternatives, representing the interests of producers and traders. His speech was compatible with that of state president João Pinheiro, whose agenda included encouraging education and polyculture.

In June 1905 Bernardes was appointed colonel of the National Guard, which legitimized his local power and conferred honors and privileges. Elected president of the City Council the following month, he preferred to remain vice-president. The following year he was elected again, accepted and was invested as executive agent, a position equivalent to mayor. The executive agent was chosen by the City Council. At a Congress of Municipalities held in Leopoldina, in October 1907, Bernardes was invited by deputy Ribeiro Junqueira to give a speech on behalf of the heads of the Executive in the region.

This rapid rise was not accepted by all veterans; José Teotônio Pacheco, Viçosa's political leader and former ally of Vaz de Melo, broke his ties with Bernardes and led the municipal opposition. The "Bernardistas" and "Pachequistas" vied for power in Viçosa for a decade. In the election of a councillor in 1906 and in the renewal of the entire City Council at the end of the following year, the Bernardists won by a small margin of votes. Cidade de Viçosa accused the Pachequistas and their newspaper A Reação of lacking patriotism and republicanism. Bernardes exchanged letters with João Pinheiro, pledging his support and making several requests to Viçosa.

=== Deputy and secretary of finance (1907–1918) ===
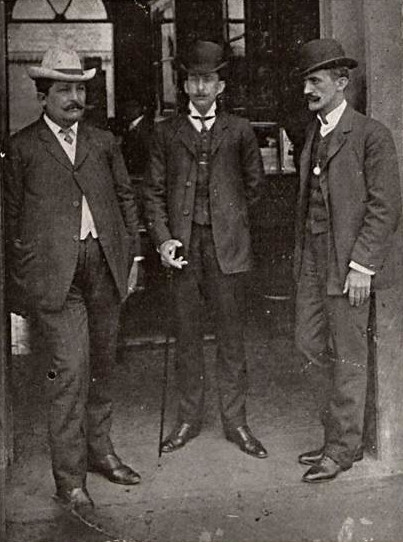
Bernardes, in the center, between two other state deputies in 1907

His deceased father-in-law's prestige was still enough for Bernardes to be included in the PRM's list of candidates for state deputy and elected for the second district in March 1907. In the state Chamber, he was elected secretary of the board in 1907 and 1908, gave speeches about agriculture issues and helped approve João Pinheiro's tax reform. This last position facilitated his nomination to run for federal deputy in 1909. The candidates for Minas Gerais' federal deputy positions were colonels or intellectuals, both chosen by the state president and the PRM's Executive Committee, known as "Tarasca", made up mostly of politicians from the southern Minas Gerais. The party prided itself on promoting the careers of young politicians. Its rule was elitist and centralized, controlling political appointments, pressuring the press, co-opting pressure groups and securing their votes through coronelism and fraud. Being chosen as a PRM candidate was equivalent to being elected.

Francisco Bernardino Rodrigues Silva, a lawyer from Juiz de Fora and previous occupant of the seat, ran as an independent candidate against Bernardes, with the support of Viçosa's Pachequistas. In January 1909, Silva obtained more votes than his rival, but a Commission for the Recognition of Powers, whose rapporteur was Altino Arantes, stripped 2,552 votes from Bernardes in Viçosa and 3,339 from Silva in Juiz de Fora. Under orders from the PRM, the Chamber of Deputies approved the decision and Bernardes was awarded more than a thousand votes above his competitor. According to Afonso Arinos de Melo Franco, the PRM confirmed Bernardes because he was "a young and energetic leader", an "experienced commander of officialdom in one of the toughest municipal struggles in Zona da Mata".

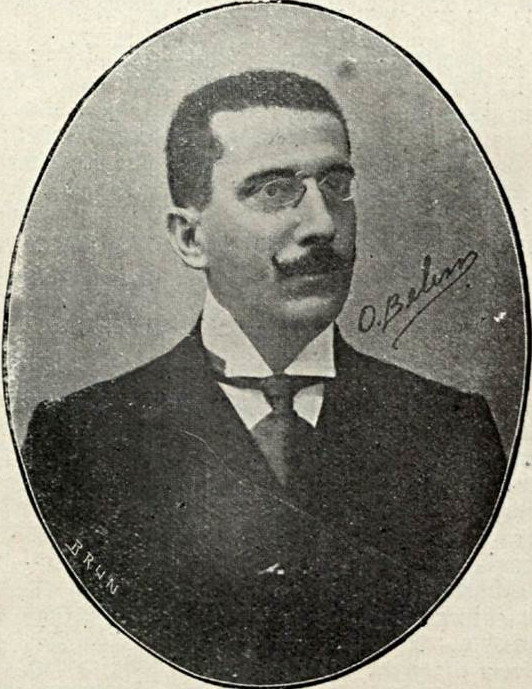
Portrait as Finance Secretary in 1913

In this first period in the Chamber of Deputies, Bernardes did not stand out nor took part in the technical committees. His greatest achievement was in Viçosa, where he secured presidential candidate Hermes da Fonseca the majority of votes in the 1910 presidential election.

On 7 September 1910, Bernardes resigned his position as federal deputy and returned to Belo Horizonte to take over the state's Finance Secretariat, after being appointed by state president Júlio Bueno Brandão. Minas Gerais had one of the largest economies in the country, and therefore the position further boosted Bernardes' career. His management focused on increasing revenue, creating tax collection offices, negotiating the taxation of mining products shipped through São Paulo and Espírito Santo, and reorganizing the Minas Gerais Receipt Office in Rio de Janeiro. These measures still had a regionalist bias, avoiding harming the interests of coffee growing in Zona da Mata.

During this period, the State Employees' Beneficial Bank and the Banco Hipotecário e Agrícola, the future Bank of the State of Minas Gerais, were created. In 1911, new types of long-term loans to municipalities benefited administrations in Zona da Mata and southern Minas Gerais, in a municipalist policy that would yield electoral dividends. Bernardes left the secretariat at the end of Bueno Brandão's government, in September 1914, and in the following January he was the candidate for federal deputy with the most votes in the district. In this second period in the Chamber of Deputies he chaired the Special Committee on the Accounting Code.

== President of Minas Gerais (1918–1922) ==
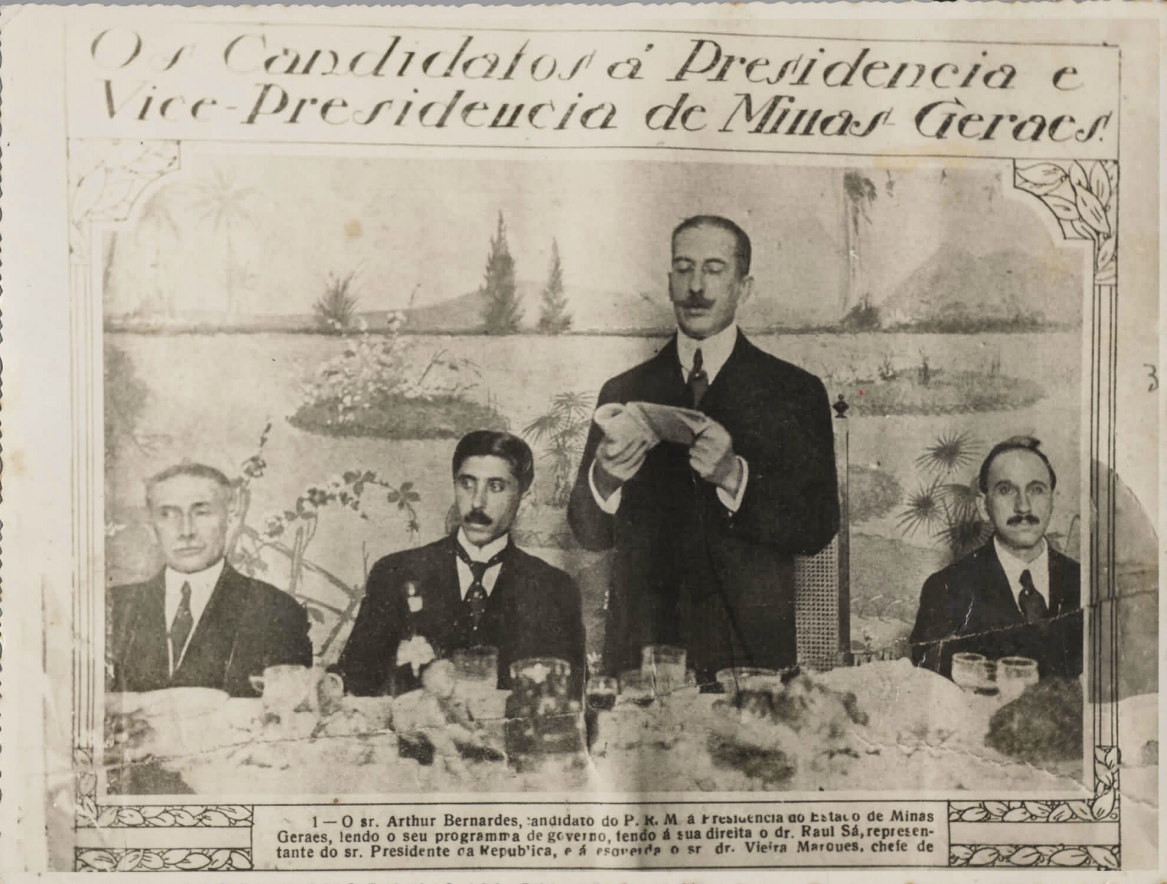
Bernardes speaking at the state government candidates' banquet

At the beginning of 1917, deputy Gomes Lima met Bernardes in Viçosa to report that Américo Lopes, Secretary of the Interior of state president Delfim Moreira, had been chosen as the PRM candidate for the state government. Bernardes confirmed his acceptance in a letter to the president. Américo Lopes was the candidate of former senator and state president Francisco Sales, president of the PRM's Executive Committee and leader of one of the three factions that existed in the party until 1918. The other two were the followers of Bias Fortes, called "Biistas" and Silviano Brandão's, the "viuvinhas". Zona da Mata politicians were usually supporters of Sales. Américo Lopes' name was contested by Raul Soares, the Secretary of Agriculture, who felt that his Zona da Mata region (he was from Ubá) was discredited. Arguing the moral incapacity of the secretaries' candidacy, especially that of the Interior, Soares convinced president Venceslau Brás, who was from Minas Gerais, to veto the candidacy. The result was a list of candidates, but it omitted Bernardes. Still feeling that Zona da Mata was overlooked, Soares then convinced the president to support Bernardes.

The name was accepted by state president Delfim Moreira and made official by the Executive Committee in June, reuniting the party. Bernardes' vice president was state senator Eduardo Amaral. Although elected deputy again, Bernardes resigned his position to take office as governor at the Palácio da Liberdade, in Belo Horizonte, in September 1918. His secretariat was set up with illustrious figures: Raul Soares and later Afonso Pena Júnior in the Interior, Afrânio de Melo Franco and later João Luís Alves in Finance and Clodomiro de Oliveira in Agriculture, Industry, Land, Transport and Public Works.

=== Hegemony in the PRM ===
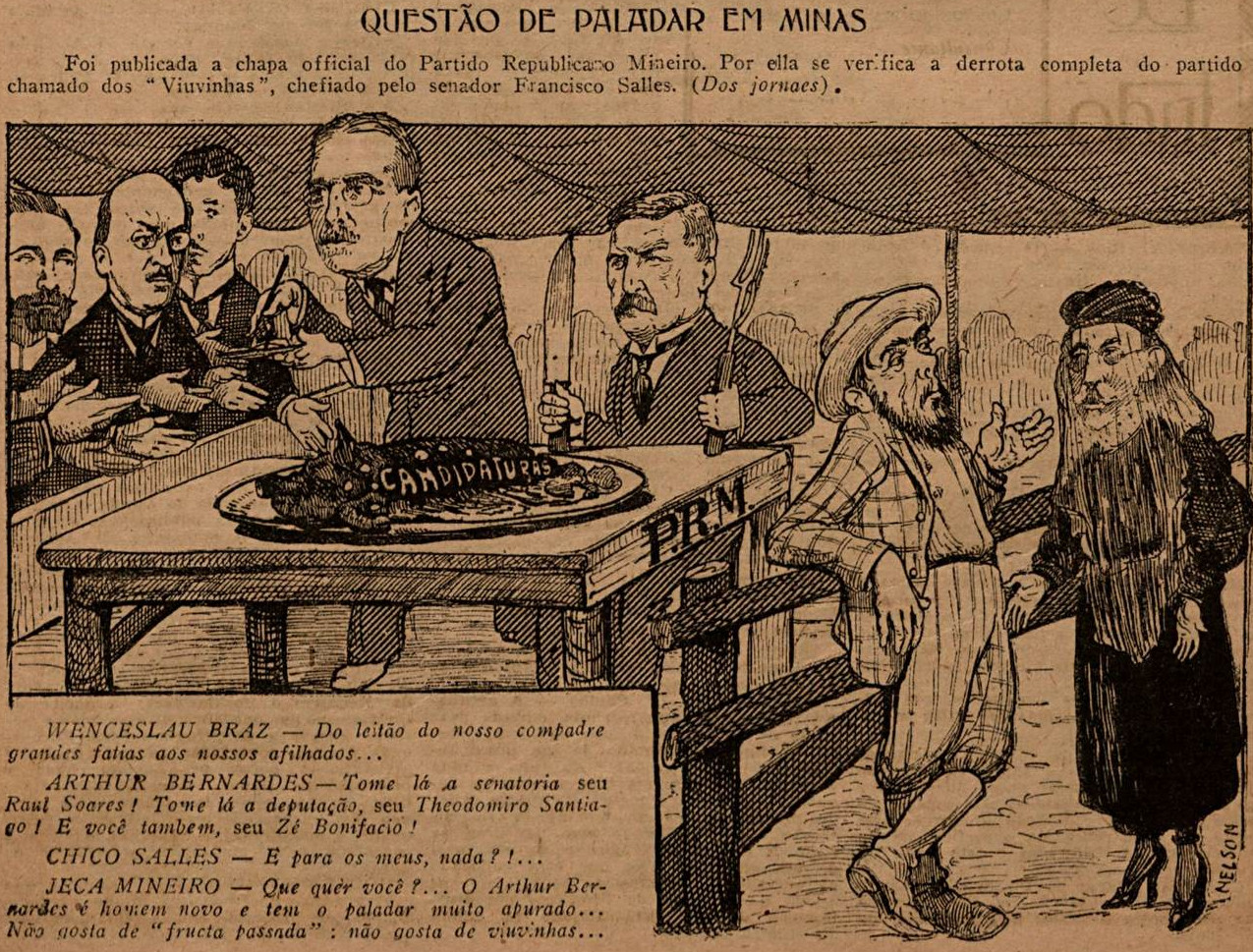
Satire in the magazine O Malho about the exclusion of the Salistas from the PRM ticket

As soon as he took office, Bernardes broke with Sales and his followers, seen by him and Raul Soares as a symbol of the old coronelism practices, and therefore a target to be eradicated. With the State apparatus in control, administration positions were handed over to loyal individuals. In the elections, 72% of the State Chamber and 50% of the State Senate were renewed. Salista deputies and senators were "beheaded", that is, their votes were not recognized by the State Chamber. Francisco Sales, who did much for Bernardes' first steps in his political career, was relegated to ostracism. Their personal feud existed since 7 July 1918 when, at a banquet held for Delfim Moreira, Sales' speech completely ignored Bernardes, who was at the main table as a Minas Gerais leader.

In February 1919, Bernardes had the "Tarasca" accept his list of candidates for a quarter of the senators and all the deputies. As of the 17 September convention, each delegate could represent no more than five local districts. In the Executive Committee, all former state presidents became perpetual members, three new positions were created and the presidency and secretariat would have to change annually.

Within two years, Bernardes imposed his authority over the Tarasca and the colonels. The fight against coronelism obviously did not affect his allies, but these were younger, intellectualized leaders, with some connections to the industrial sector and focused on economic development. A true generational transition took place in the PRM. The first generation, responsible for consolidating the Brazilian Republic in Minas Gerais, was replaced by another that entered public life around the 1910s. Southern Minas Gerais lost its predominance in state politics and the Zona da Mata gained prominence. Members of the government now owed allegiance to the state president and not to the PRM's Executive Committee.

=== Presidential election of 1919 ===
Two Minas Gerais politicians, Artur Bernardes and Melo Franco, were considered to run for president in the election scheduled for April 1919. For health reasons, the winner of the 1918 election, Rodrigues Alves, never took office, and his vice president Delfim Moreira ruled the country for around eight months until a successor was chosen. Bernardes refused his own candidacy, which would have been of interest to the Minas Gerais elites, and insisted that the three strongest states (Minas Gerais, São Paulo and Rio Grande do Sul) decided on a new name. Several reasons are speculated for his refusal, such as fears of a lack of support from São Paulo and Rio Grande do Sul or a bad reaction from public opinion, as a Minas Gerais politician already occupied the presidency, and the inconvenience of interrupting a recently installed administration. It would first be necessary to gather prestige in the state government.

Even without running, Bernardes managed to position himself as the arbiter of the presidential succession. On 9 February, the Tarasca invested him with leadership of negotiations in Minas Gerais. João Luís Alves and Raul Soares were his emissaries. On the 25th he presided over the Convention in the Federal Senate building, in Rio de Janeiro, to make Epitácio Pessoa, from Paraíba, official as the status quo candidate. São Paulo politicians resented Bernardes for his refusal to support a candidacy by Altino Arantes, president of São Paulo. Pessoa, a neutral candidate between the three largest states, São Paulo, Minas Gerais and Rio Grande do Sul, was the result of the latter two's rejection to Arantes. The proposal for Pessoa's name came from Minas Gerais and was accepted by São Paulo. Pessoa's victory in the election came as no surprise.

=== Reforms and works ===
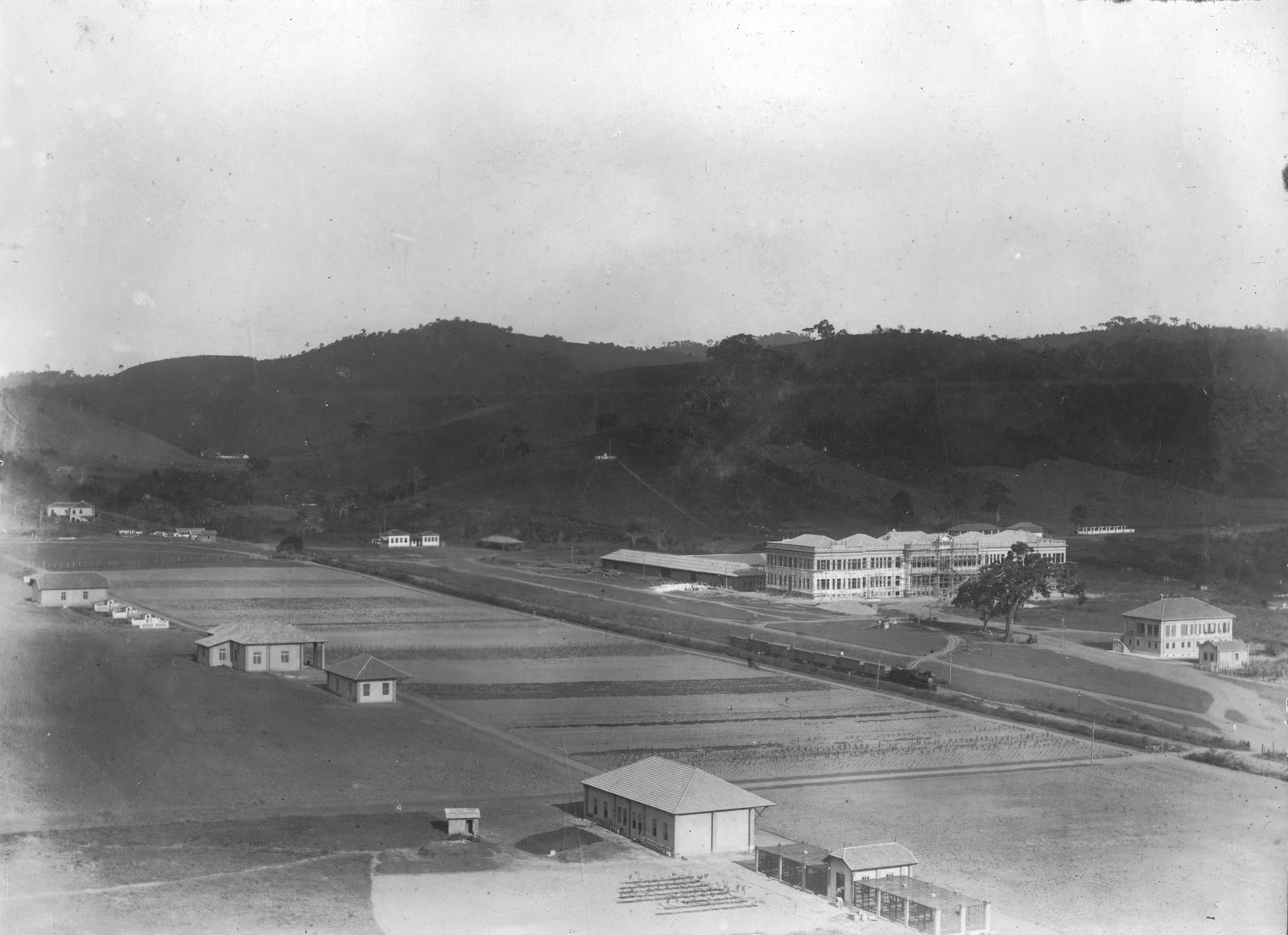
Construction of ESAV in Viçosa

The Bernardes state administration privileged the Zona da Mata. Education was a priority in the program and effective advances were made in public secondary and higher education. 13 school groups and 421 isolated schools were built in primary and secondary education. A new regulation for itinerant agricultural education, on 12 July 1920, reinforced the practical education provided by district and rural schools. In higher education, the government created the Institute of Industrial Chemistry and expanded the clinics at the Faculty of Medicine of Belo Horizonte.

A highlight was the creation of the Higher School of Agriculture and Veterinary Science (ESAV), the future Federal University of Viçosa. Bernardes began the creation process with a decree on 6 September 1920. The ESAV's headquarters would be in a region with a predominance of small and medium-sized coffee farms in the Zona da Mata, which would depend on agricultural modernization to resist the pressures of coffee valorization policies. The city chosen was Viçosa, precisely the president's hometown. According to the book A Universidade Federal de Viçosa no Século XX, published by Editora UFV, the school's location was not an arbitrary decision by Bernardes and took into account the topography, water availability and proximity to the Leopoldina Railway. Teaching would be along American lines. The inauguration only took place in 1926.

In agriculture, the Bernardes administration granted favors to Banco de Crédito Real de Minas Gerais and Banco Hipotecário e Agrícola, hoping to alleviate the insolvency of rural cooperatives. The administration lowered export taxes on coffee, livestock and cereals and maintained the coffee price guarantee, which deserved more attention according to the president. At the suggestion of the Executive, on 20 September 1919, legislators approved a reform of the land tax, seeking to curb fraud and evasion in the declaration of land values. Many years ago, this tax was discussed in Minas Gerais as a way of discouraging unproductive large estates, and one of the points of the PRM's economic program was the "remodeling of the tax regime, based on territorial and income taxes, with the gradual suppression of the export tax on the State's budget revenue".

A law on the supply of agricultural machinery by the Secretariat of Agriculture was approved in 1919, but would only be effectively put into practice in the following government. For another point of the program, the "settling of the State's territory", four large mixed colonies of German immigrants and Brazilian farmers were founded: the Álvaro da Silvera, Bueno Brandão, David Campista and Francisco Sá colonies. The expansion of the road network, mentioned in the program, included the construction of 1,498 kilometers of highways, 138 bridges, subsidies for other highways and the government's acquisition of the Paracatu and Goiás Railways. The State's real estate assets and revenue grew and a large part of its debt was paid off.

A decree of February 1924 applying to the Federal District regulated work in bakeries and the bread-producing industry.

=== The iron issue ===
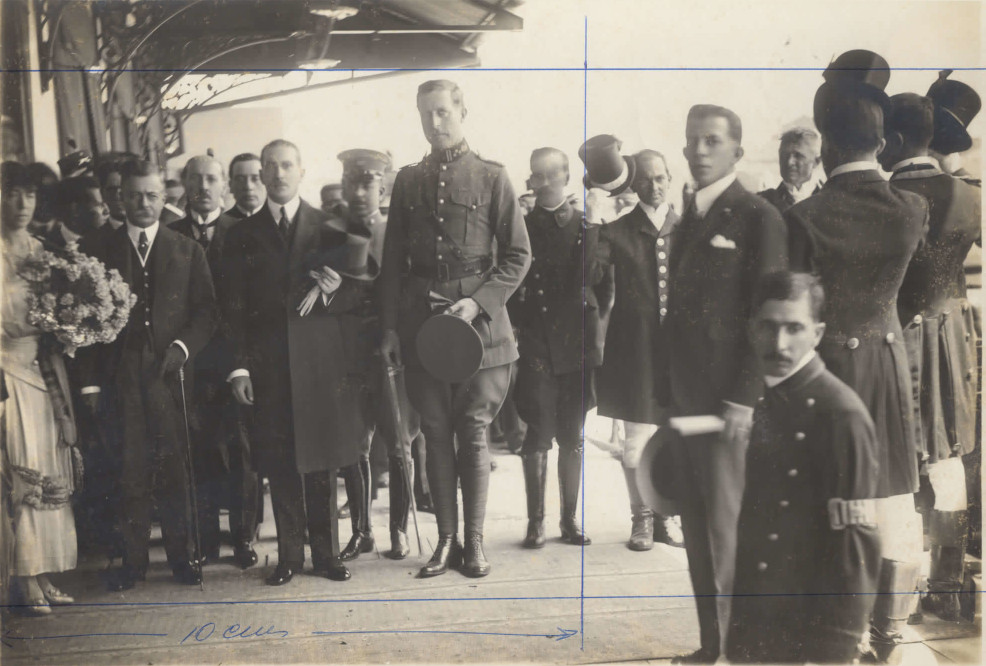
King Albert I of Belgium, in the center, with Bernardes to his left

Bernardes' industrial ambition was to transform the Rio Doce Valley into Brazil's "Ruhr Valley", a complex of mines, railways, steel mills and ports from Minas Gerais to Espírito Santo. Minas Gerais had large unused iron ore deposits, and Brazil's steel production was incipient. Bernardes and Raul Soares wanted a steel industry and were against the simple export of iron ore. The model intended by Secretary of Agriculture Clodomiro de Oliveira consisted of small plants powered by electricity, charcoal and mineral coal from Santa Catarina, with technology from the Mining School of Ouro Preto, where Oliveira was a professor. The use of charcoal brought with it the issue of deforestation, of which Bernardes was aware. His speeches outlined his concern with the "conservation of forests and reforestation of the State, threatened with seeing large portions of its territory transformed into bare and barren zones".

In September 1919, the Minas Gerais Congress lowered the iron ore export tax for companies that transformed at least 5% of the exported amount into iron and steel. Otherwise, the tax would be a hundred times higher. Laws of the same content were approved in the following years. Several steel plants were founded during this period under the stimulus of the state government, all with low production. The exception was the Companhia Siderúrgica Belgo-Mineira (CSBM), the first medium-sized integrated steel company in Brazil, whose plant in Sabará began operations in 1925. Although far from making the country self-sufficient, it made Minas Gerais export steel workers to other states. The CSBM was the result of negotiations that began during the visit of king Albert I of Belgium to Brazil in 1920; Bernardes invited him to Minas Gerais to attract Belgian capital, and the state government made an agreement with a Brazilian company, Companhia Siderúrgica Mineira, and another Belgian-Luxembourgish company, ARBED.

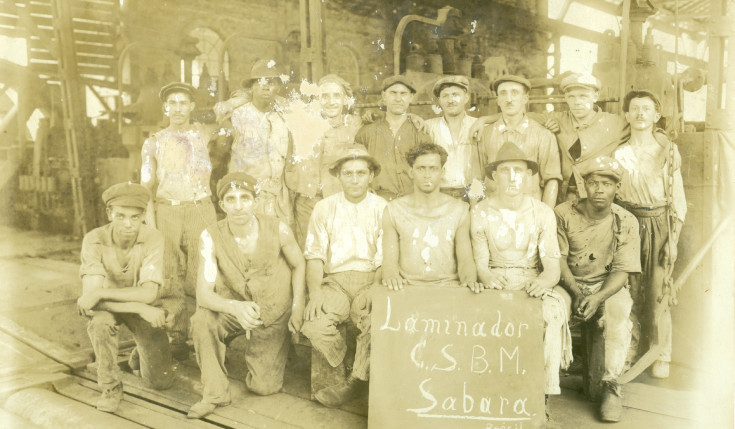
CSBM workers, established with Belgian capital, in 1925

The attitude of the Minas Gerais government was different towards the trade union of American investor Percival Farquhar, who had acquired shares in the Itabira Iron Ore Company and received approval from the federal government to export iron ore through private lines to the Vitória-Minas Railway and a private port to be built as far as Santa Cruz, in Espírito Santo. In return, Farquhar would install a steel and rolling mill in Santa Cruz, powered by European and American coal. Brazil's National Congress took from 1920 to 1928 to debate the contract, and in the meantime Farquhar negotiated another contract with the government of Minas Gerais, as stipulated in the federal contract.

In September 1920, the Minas Gerais Congress authorized the Executive to hire Itabira Iron or another company to install one or more steel plants in the state. Debates between legislators and technicians soured the initial positive attitude, and Clodomiro de Oliveira managed to convince Bernardes to postpone the signing of the contract. The Minas Gerais government doubted the promise of a large steel plant and feared that the company would charge exaggerated prices on the domestic market and create a monopoly on ore transportation. Bernardes adopted a nationalist stance, demanding that foreign companies prove the benefits of their contracts. Even so, his messages to the Minas Gerais Congress did not peremptorily reject Farquhar's proposal.

== Presidential election of 1922 ==
=== Pre-candidacy (1919–1921) ===
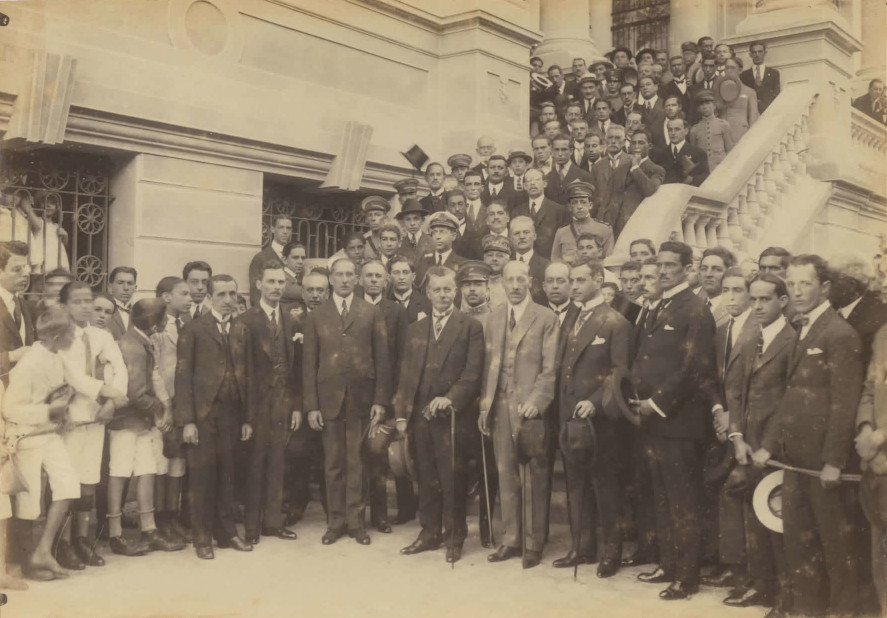
President Epitácio Pessoa and state president Artur Bernardes in Belo Horizonte

Since the 1919 election it was clear that Bernardes could become president of Brazil, even if he had to wait for the next election. Prudente de Morais Filho reportedly told Afrânio de Melo Franco that Bernardes would certainly be president of Brazil "because he is from Minas Gerais, he doesn't compromise, he is tenacious and always wears well-creased pants". If Bernardes' candidacy was obvious, support for it was not, and all the PRM's actions at the national level were directed towards the ambition of the presidency.

The Minas Gerais-São Paulo alliance supported the administration of Epitácio Pessoa in Congress. Minas Gerais took advantage of the relative weakness of Epitácio Pessoa, who was from a small state (Paraíba), and although it only received one ministry (that of the Navy, under Raul Soares), it managed to place PRM deputy Astolfo Dutra in the Presidency of the Chamber of Deputies, despite Rio Grande do Sul and Bahia's opposition. The São Paulo allies were also competitors, as they had their own pre-candidate, state president Washington Luís. On 21 March 1920, Raul Soares wrote to Bernardes to alert him of São Paulo's funding for Minas Gerais opposition newspapers and São Paulo's negotiations with Francisco Sales.

Still in 1920, Bernardes sought the support of J. J. Seabra, president of Bahia, sending weapons to defend his government against the armed revolt of colonel Horácio de Matos. This measure was heavily criticized in the press. Another letter from Raul Soares, in July, expressed the fear of an alliance between São Paulo and the federal government around the candidacy of Nilo Peçanha from Rio de Janeiro. In September, Bernardes reconciled a dispute between São Paulo politicians and the president of Brazil regarding the issuance of currency to support coffee. A newspaper at the time assessed that Bernardes prevented Epitácio Pessoa from isolating São Paulo, as he could not give up the alliance.

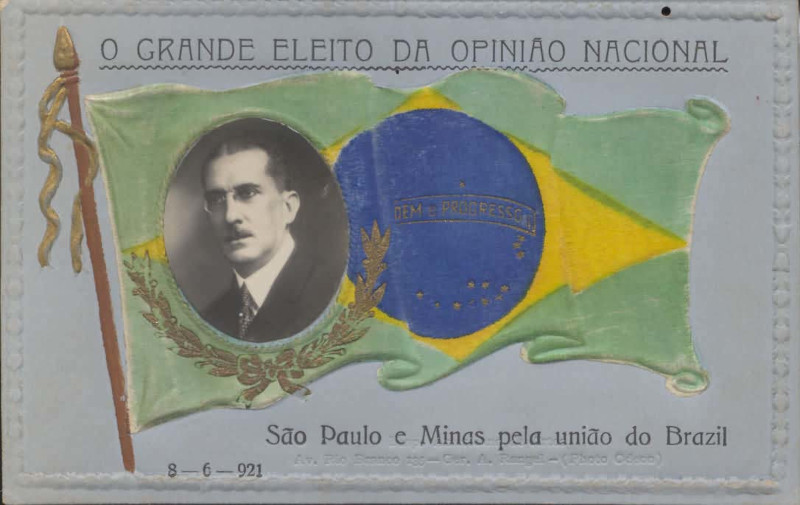
A 1921 postcard presents Bernardes' candidacy: "São Paulo and Minas [Gerais] for the union of Brazil"

Negotiations for the presidential succession began early, in the first months of 1921, due to the wear and tear of the federal government in multiple sectors: with the military, the urban population and the oligarchies of Minas Gerais and São Paulo. The PRM launched Bernardes' candidacy in April and called state leaders to a national convention. São Paulo accepted it on the condition of meeting its economic demands, support from Epitácio Pessoa's government and future support for a candidacy by Washington Luís. Epitácio Pessoa accepted Bernardes' candidacy practically by imposition. In order to attract the northern states, Minas Gerais promised to continue the public works begun under Pessoa's administration.

Consensus around the official candidacy was usually easy. Until May, most states had approved Bernardes' candidacy, with the notable exception of Rio Grande do Sul. The economic promises made to São Paulo were incompatible with Rio Grande do Sul's goals, and in the assessment of Minas Gerais politicians, Rio Grande do Sul had become the opposition for being excluded from the choice. The choice of the vice presidential candidate, Urbano Santos, added Pernambuco and Bahia to the opposition, both of which had their own pre-candidates. The convention to approve the official candidacy took place in the Senate on 8 June, with the absence of delegates from Rio Grande do Sul, Pernambuco, Bahia and Rio de Janeiro. The loss of Rio de Janeiro was yet another surprise to Minas Gerais, as Nilo Peçanha had previously advised the Republican Party of Rio de Janeiro to support Bernardes' candidacy, but now stated that the commitment "was premature", despite the "confidence inspired by Mr. Bernardes and the tradition of Minas Gerais' politics".

Of the 192 delegates present, 188 approved the candidacy. From the Senate galleries came boos at Bernardes' first statements and even imitations of a sheep's bleating. Bernardes was already the subject of ridicule for his appearance. (Note: "He was a serious man, with a small mustache carefully trimmed so as not to extend beyond his lips. Shortsighted, he wore pince-nez. A striking nose and a high forehead due to early baldness. Overall, more than one cartoonist noticed, his face resembled that of a ram" (Doria 2016, cap. 4).) Days earlier, Bernardist senator Paulo de Frontin had blamed the political instability on "street scoundrels and the ambition of the barracks."

=== Election campaign ===
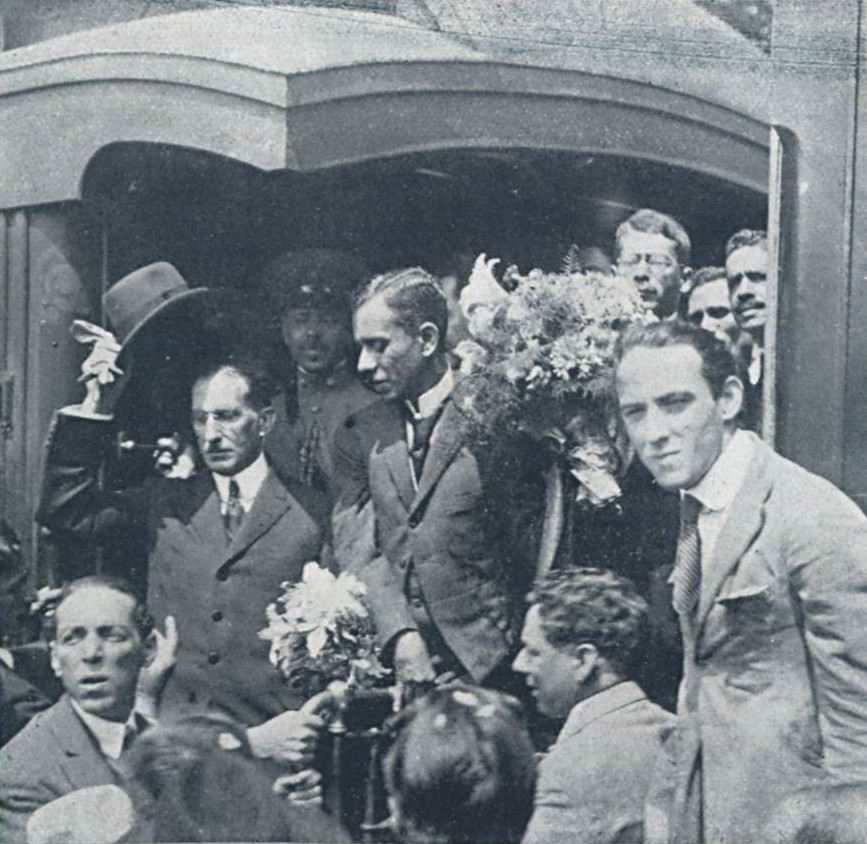
Bernardes being received by his supporters at the Juparanã train station, in Valença, Rio de Janeiro

The four dissident states joined together in the so-called Republican Reaction to launch the candidacies of Nilo Peçanha for president of Brazil and J. J. Seabra for vice president. The split between the state oligarchies has several explanations in historiography: the issue of the vice presidency, the association with urban dissent, the economic policy exclusively focused on coffee and the Minas Gerais-São Paulo monopoly on State benefits. A third pre-candidate, marshal Hermes da Fonseca, became unfeasible, but his military support then went to the Republican Reaction . On 26 April, Fonseca visited Bernardes at the Palácio da Liberdade, but without any political results.

It was at this point that Bernardes' political rise stopped being peaceful and he entered the crisis of the First Brazilian Republic, which was going through its last decade. Minas Gerais was running without traditional allies, but the support of the federal government, São Paulo and smaller states gave Bernardes' candidacy a good chance. Bernardes refused proposals to withdraw his candidacy so that a conciliatory name could be reached. The traditional method of securing votes, distributing favors to oligarchs and colonels from the countryside, gave a clear advantage to the side supported by the federal machine. Nilo Peçanha also used this method, but complemented it with the military and the urban masses, who felt marginalized from the political system. The economic and social situation was deteriorating.

In the second half of the year, fake letters attributed to Bernardes, with insulting comments about Hermes da Fonseca and the military, were published behind the scenes and were even offered to Bernardes himself. The letters were disclosed on 9 October by Correio da Manhã. The first letter, addressed to Raul Soares, called Fonseca a "sergeant without manners", his campaign event an "orgy" and the officers "scoundrels", "venal" in "almost all of them". The forgers, Oldemar Lacerda and Jacinto Guimarães, skillfully manipulated the military's resentment for the contempt they received from the civilian elite. Bernardes immediately denied authorship of the letters, and Fonseca agreed that they were fake.

At the beginning of the electoral campaign, on the 15th, the Bernardist delegation was greeted by boos from a huge crowd in downtown Rio de Janeiro. According to one witness, the protesters "assaulted the cars, insulted the occupants with obscene words, struck the windows and headlights with sticks taken from the trees, and howled like those possessed, in a kind of furious liberation". Bernardes continued to the traditional candidate presentation banquet, at which he read his platform: a constitutional review at the initiative of Congress, budget balance, currency appreciation and the protection of coffee and industry. These proposals were not that different from those of Nilo Peçanha.

The campaign was fierce, involving personal attacks and satires. For the Republican Reaction, Bernardes' candidacy was an imposition of the oligarchies on the people. The press was polarized between the two candidates and exchanged insults and accusations. Bernardes received the popular nicknames "Seu Mé" (Mr. Mé), for his sharp profile, similar to a ram, and "rolinha", for his thinness. Only Hermes da Fonseca, during the 1910 presidential election, was more ridiculed. The carnival song Ai, Seu Mé, very popular during the 1922 Carnival, warned that "there at the Palácio das Águias" (Catete), "he [Bernardes] shall not set his foot". Bernardes' supporters almost lynched former deputy Maurício de Lacerda when he landed in Juiz de Fora, on 24 January 1922, and the Minas Gerais police did not intervene.

Anti-Bernardes satires in the press

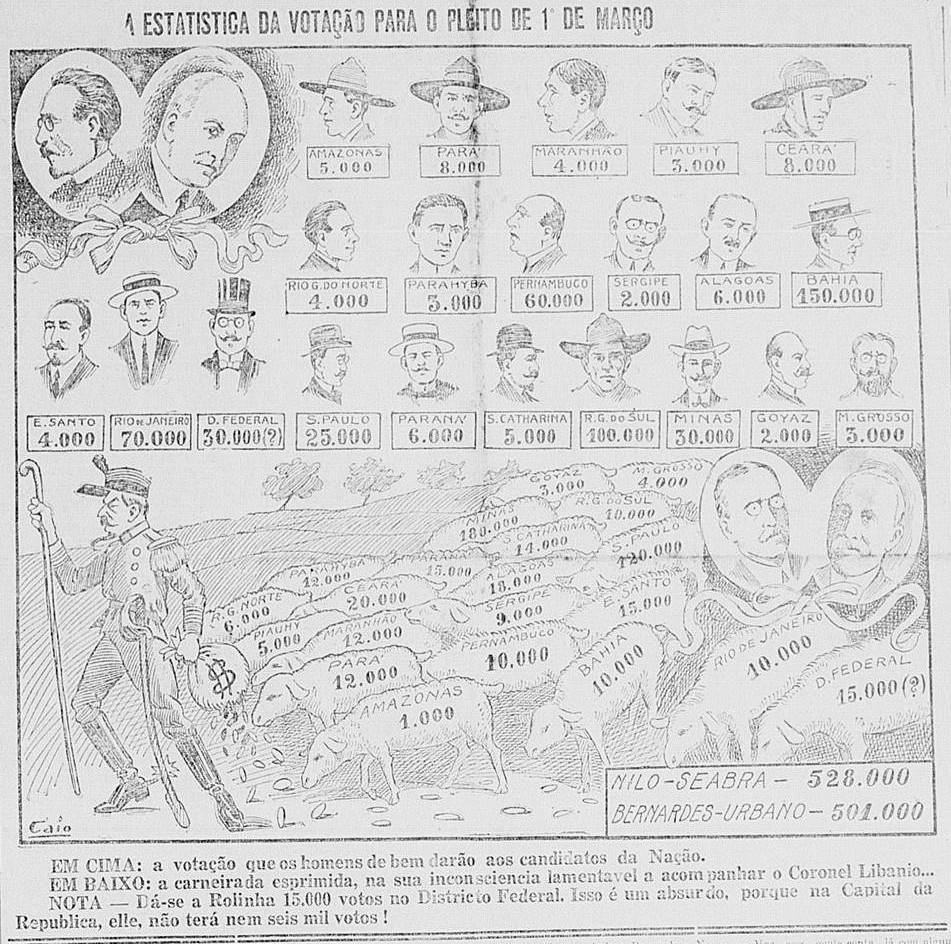
Voters like sheep, driven by bribery

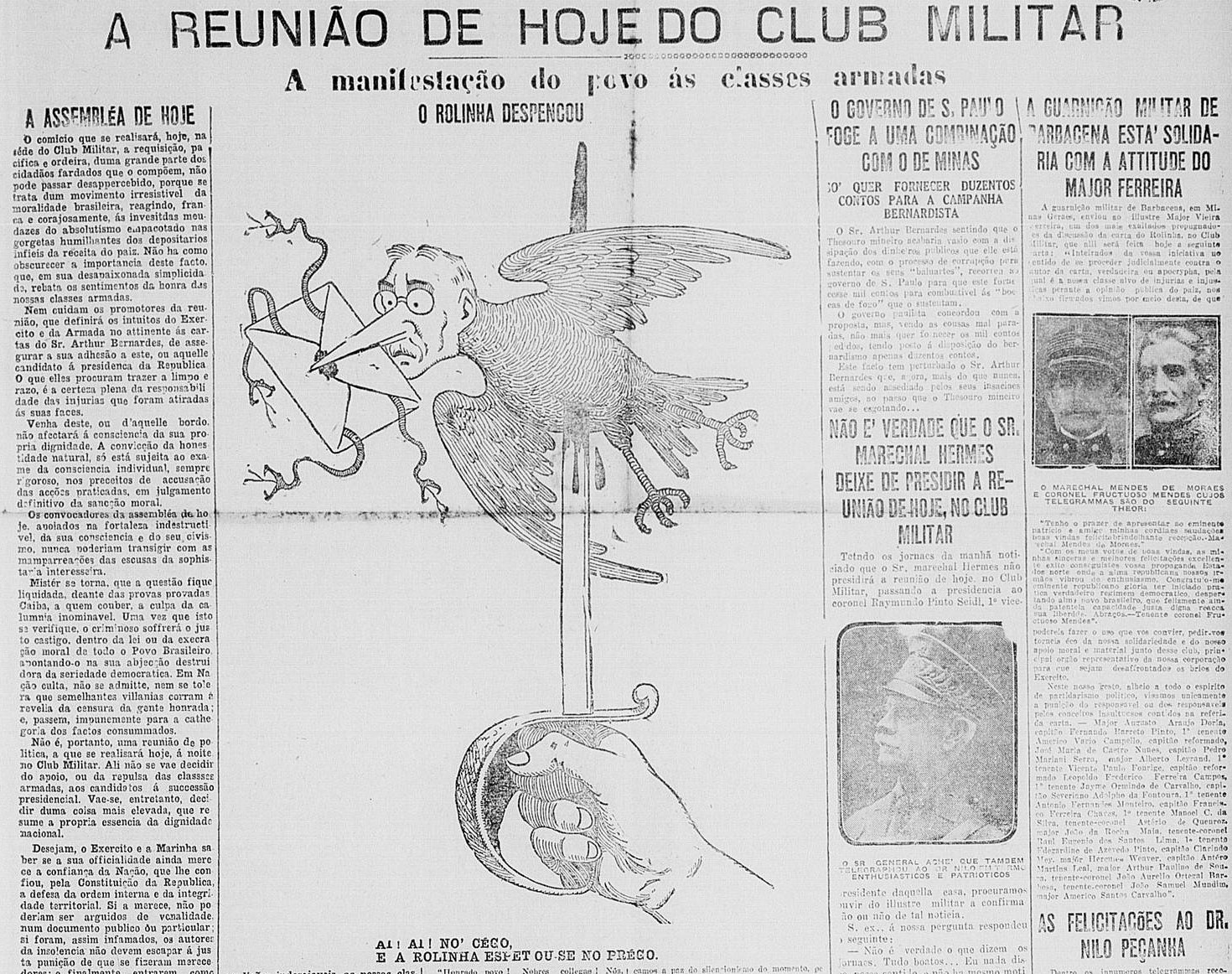
Rolinha pierced by the military's sword

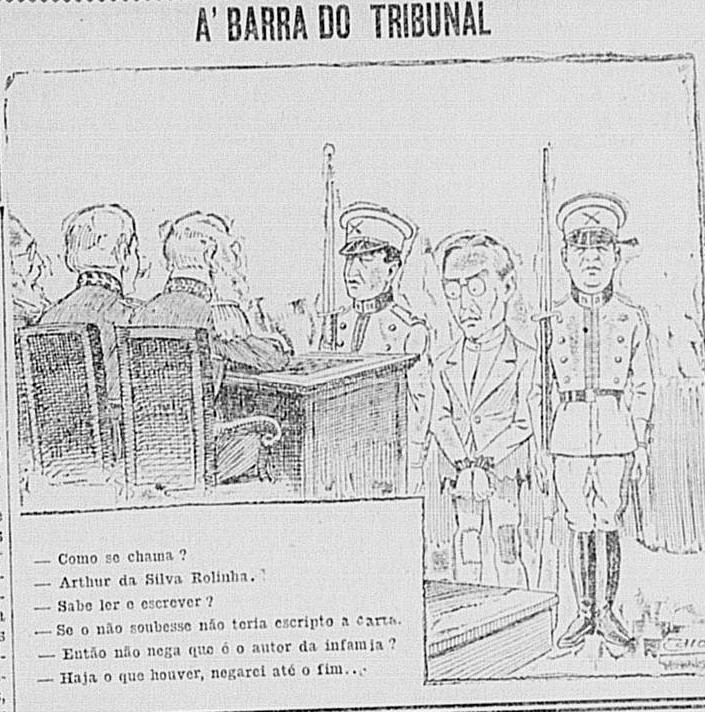
An imagined trial by the fake letters

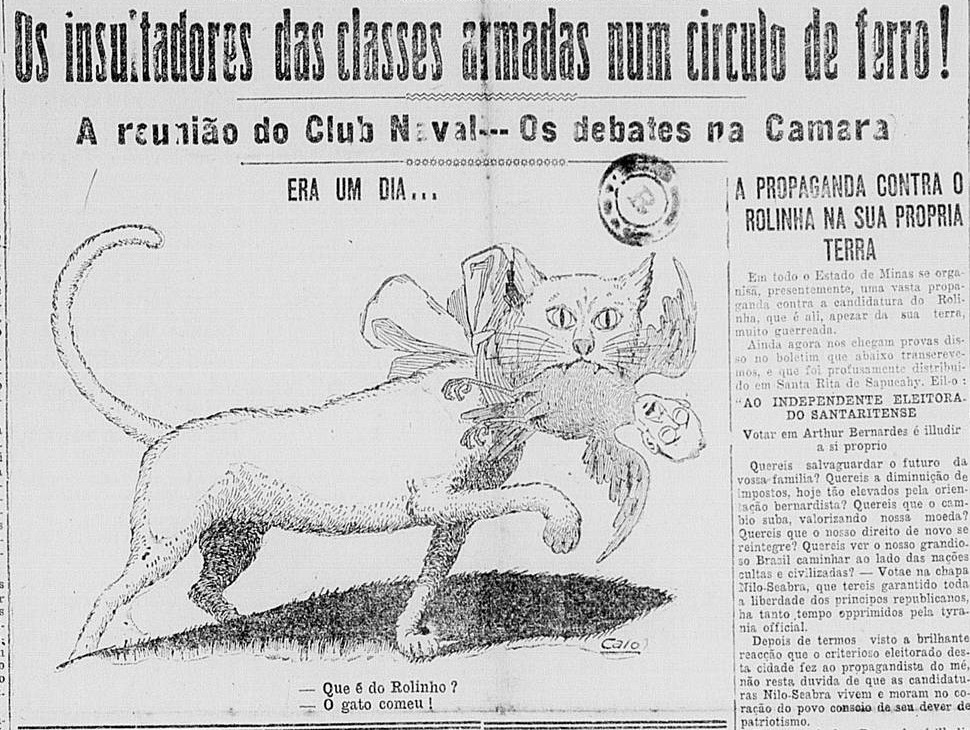
"The insulters of the armed classes in an iron circle"

The issue of the fake letters radicalized the military, a segment that was already dissatisfied. The Military Club, chaired by Hermes da Fonseca, created a commission to study the authenticity of the letters. Under pressure from anti-Bernardists, it confirmed the authenticity of the first letter on 28 December 1921, despite evidence of fraud pointed out by experts. The report proposed handing the judgment over to the nation, that is, to the polls. Other oppositionists argued that "if the letters were fake, their thought was true". Disciplinary incidents and punishments began in the Brazilian Army even before the election, with soldiers openly positioning themselves in favor of Nilo Peçanha and against Bernardes. Some were already thinking about a coup d'état.

=== Contested results ===
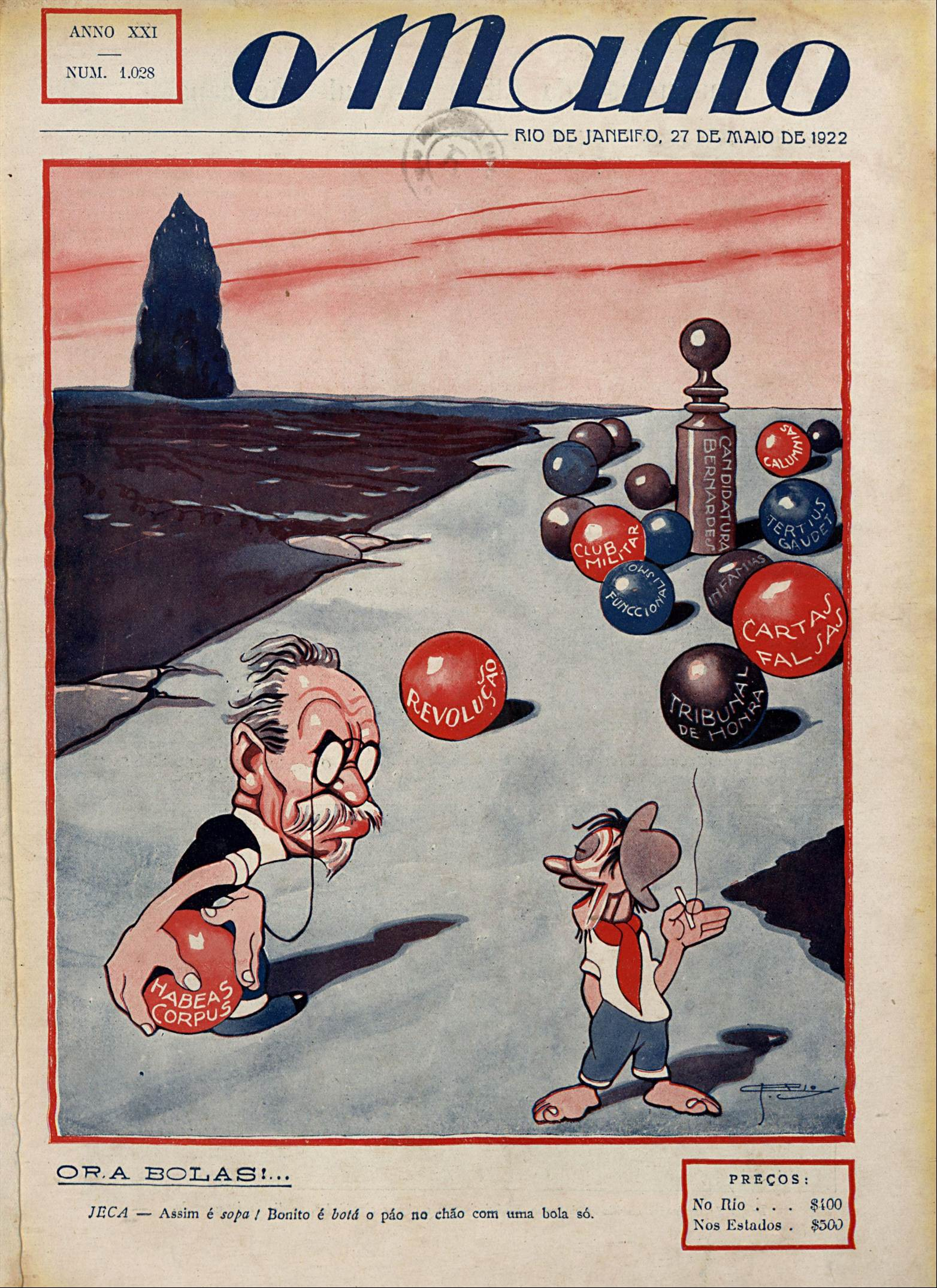
Caricature in the magazine O Malho: Bernardes' candidacy survives the "revolution", the "Military Club", the "fake letters", and the "Court of Honor"

The election, held on 1 March 1922, gave 466,972 votes to Artur Bernardes against 317,714 for Nilo Peçanha, a narrow and surprising margin by the standards of the First Republic. Peçanha accused the results of fraud, proclaimed himself a "moral winner" and proposed a "Court of Honor", with five representatives from Congress and five from the Supreme Federal Court (STF), to determine the fairness of the election. Outgoing president Epitácio Pessoa and some status quo leaders even considered the proposal, but Minas Gerais ones refused it. On 1 May, Pessoa gathered his military ministers and representatives from São Paulo and Minas Gerais to discuss the situation, which according to him, was getting out of control.

To fight the military conspiracy, untrustworthy officers had been transferred away from the capital. The forgers of the letters had confessed to the fraud, and most officers accepted Bernardes' explanations. Still, some low ranking officers devised coup plots. But Pessoa still believed that Bernardes should resign, as "he won't last 24 hours at Catete". Bernardes refused, saying he was elected "in the most disputed and free of presidential elections". Congress proclaimed his victory on 7 June.

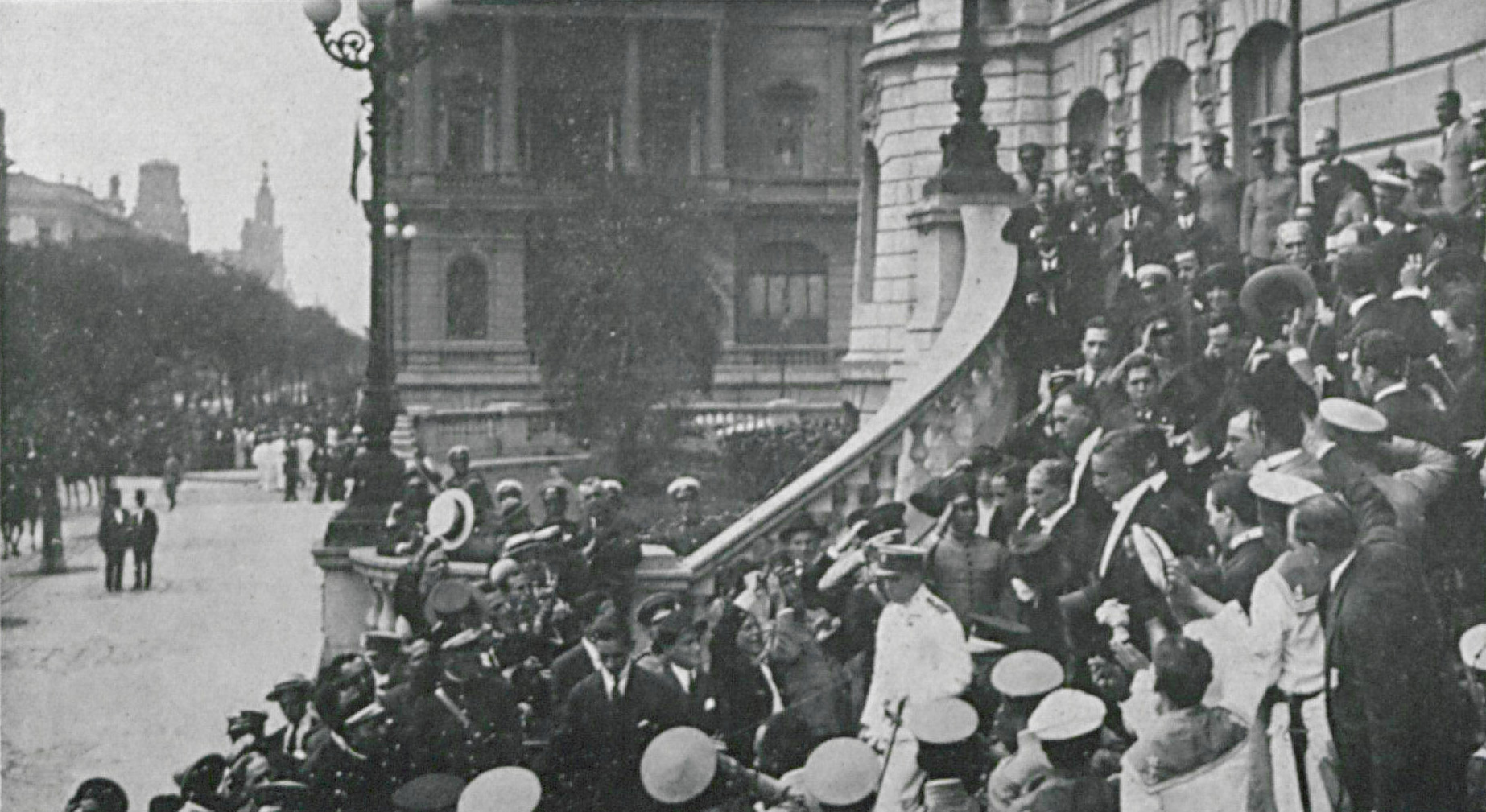
Bernardes walking down the stairs of the Chamber of Deputies after his inauguration

The attempted coup, or revolution, would come to be known as the first episode of the tenentist movement. Still politically immature, it was led by a portion of the army's young officers who were dissatisfied with society, the role the army played in it and the conduct of civilian politicians, including Bernardes. The revolt began on 5 July and was much smaller than expected by the conspirators, being limited to a few units in Rio de Janeiro, Niterói and Mato Grosso. Loyalist forces promptly restored control. The shocking spectacle of the last rebels from Fort Copacabana, who fell in combat in a suicidal march along Atlântica Avenue, changed the political climate and served as an inspiration for future revolts.

In response, Congress approved the declaration of a state of emergency in the Federal District and the state of Rio de Janeiro, which was preventatively extended until 31 December. Police repression, including the closure of Correio da Manhã, secured the remainder of Pessoa's term. On the 9th, Bernardes asked Afrânio de Melo Franco to insist to the president of Brazil to "take all the advantages" of the state of emergency. "Among other things, he [the president] should, in my opinion, arrest the rioters and idlers who infest Rio and Niterói, and deport them far away, to Acre, for example." On 7 September, Bernardes handed over the Minas Gerais government to Raul Soares. The day before, he promoted a large number of officers from the Public Force of Minas Gerais. Throughout his administration, investments in training and equipment had won the sympathy of the officers of this military force, whose soldiers would be nicknamed "Bernardes' henchmen" in the following years.

On 15 November 1922, the first presidential inauguration under a state of emergency in Brazilian history took place. The inauguration party had a heavy armed escort from the Public Force of Minas Gerais. As a security measure, the oath ceremony took place in the Chamber of Deputies rather than the Senate. Estácio Coimbra took office as vice president, after a new election was held following the unexpected death of Urbano dos Santos in May.

== Presidency (1922–1926) ==
=== Cabinet ===
Bernardes with the entire ministry on inauguration day

Bernardes handed the ministries to Rafael de Abreu Sampaio Vidal (Finance), João Luís Alves (Interior), Félix Pacheco (Foreign Affairs), Francisco Sá (Transport and Public Works), Miguel Calmon (Agriculture), Setembrino de Carvalho (War) and Alexandrino de Alencar (Navy). The selection represented broad civilian support. In the War Ministry, it was difficult to find a loyal name to the government and respected among its peers.

Bernardes arrived isolated and embittered in the federal capital, an unknown environment full of threats. His administration was unpopular in Rio de Janeiro and in urban areas in general due to the rise in the cost of living, which doubled between 1921 and 1923, according to some imprecise calculations. The cause was the policy of coffee appreciation, which inflated the economy and depreciated the exchange rate. The country was divided and the government had enemies in the urban middle classes, military tenentists, workers and dissident state oligarchies.

=== State crises ===
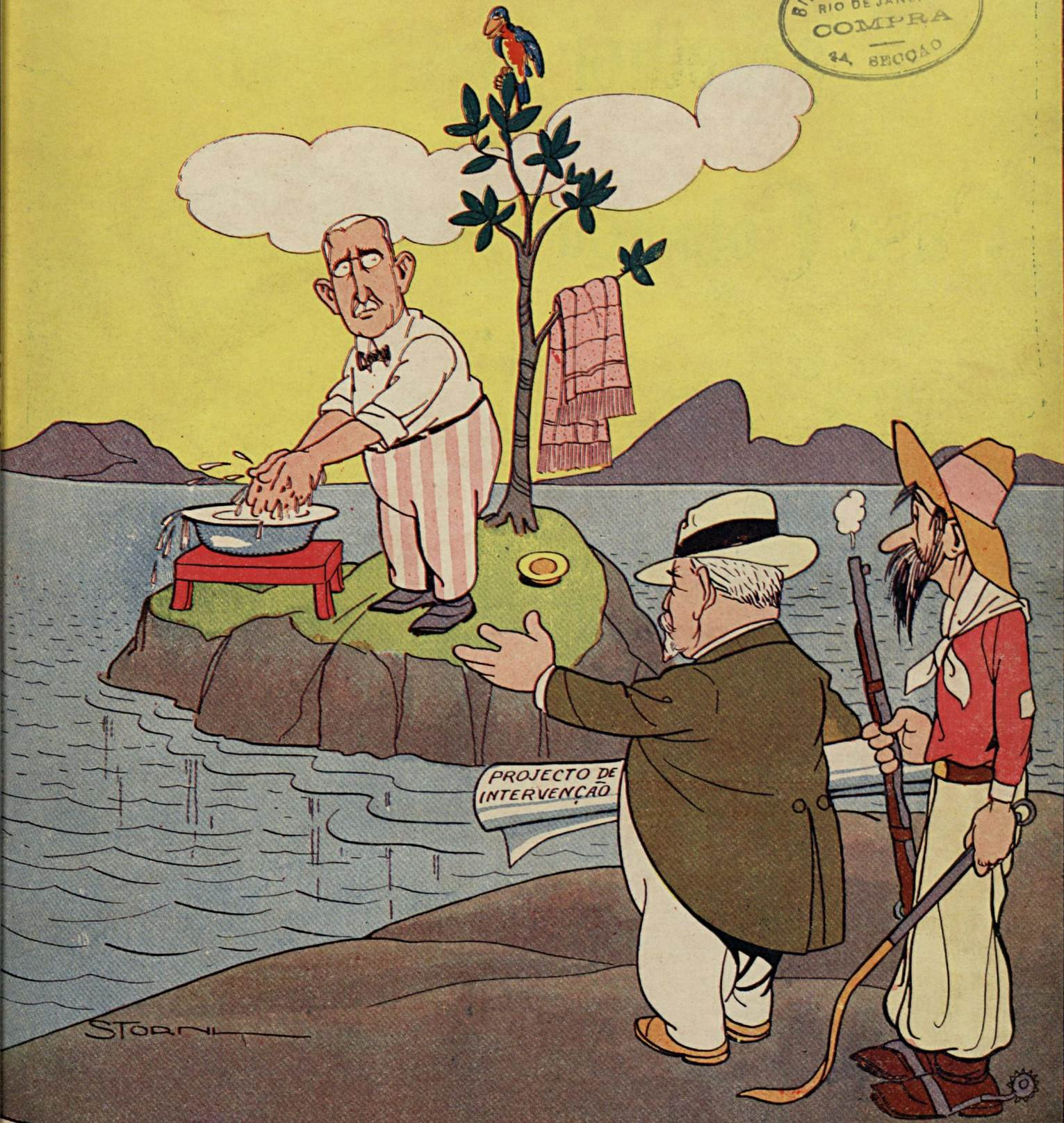
Magazine Careta, October 1923: Bernardes washes his hands, like Pilate, in Rio Grande do Sul's case "because I got them dirty in Rio de Janeiro's case"

Rio de Janeiro, Rio Grande do Sul and Bahia, former members of the Republican Reaction, all had internal political crises, with risks of federal intervention and local oppositions that sought support from Bernardes. Strengthened, the federal Executive obtained favorable state presidents in all three. The predominant interpretation in memoirs and historiography is that Bernardes was vengeful. Even his defenders admitted that the interventions were "preemptive", planned in advance. According to the interpretation of Brazilianist Eul-Soo Pang, Bernardes replaced the "governors' policy" with the "presidents' policy", in which the federal Executive was the arbiter of state disputes.

In the first days of January 1923, STF president Hermínio Francisco do Espírito Santo sought out Bernardes and the Minister of the Interior to discuss Rio de Janeiro. Raul Fernandes, a "Nilist" (ally of Nilo Peçanha), had taken office as state president, secured by federal troops and a writ of habeas corpus from the Supreme Court. The opposition, which did not recognize the election results, installed Feliciano Sodré in the same position, thus creating a parallel government. Violence spread throughout Rio de Janeiro's countryside, where Nilist Municipal Councils were deposed. Hermínio Espírito Santo was convinced that habeas corpus had already been fulfilled and municipal authorities were not protected by it.

In response, Bernardes decreed federal intervention in the state of Rio de Janeiro on 10 January, "considering that the State of Rio currently has two governments", reigning "a permanent state of disorder". The federal government was not exempt; its authorities boycotted Raul Fernandes and his supporters, and police officers from the Federal District participated in the depositions of municipal authorities. The intervention decree installed Aurelino Leal as head of Rio de Janeiro's government, a position he took advantage of to dismantle the Nilist political machine. The decision to intervene in Rio de Janeiro was much discussed and even the STF itself debated whether to issue a note of protest for non-compliance with its habeas corpus. Contemporary jurists and politicians approved the intervention, but biographers of those involved tried to exempt their responsibilities. Raul Soares had written to Bernardes in December warning against the idea, as it would be an "act of force that is repugnant to our legalist spirit". According to Aurelino Leal, Bernardes regretted "directly affecting a man as distinguished as Raul Fernandes", and said he "would like to see what Nilo will say to all this".

In Rio Grande do Sul, Bernardes did not dare to intervene, despite the ongoing Revolution of 1923, a civil war in which with the opposition waged a rural guerrilla against the government of Borges de Medeiros. The Republican Party of Rio Grande do Sul was rooted in power and protected by the state's Military Brigade. The Federal Army remained neutral, although biased towards the opposition. The Pact of Pedras Altas, brokered by the Minister of War in December, amnestied the rebels and prohibited Medeiros' re-election. Borges de Medeiros gained a few additional years in power, at the cost of a pledge of loyalty to Bernardes.

In Bahia, the conflict was not so large, but federal troops secured the inauguration of state president Góis Calmon in March 1924, ending the rule of J. J. Seabra. Later, from December to February, Bernardes did not support Calmon in his military expeditions against Horácio de Matos, a powerful colonel from Chapada Diamantina. Matos and Bernardes were linked through Francisco Sá Filho, a federal deputy for Minas Gerais and son of the Minister of Transport. Bernardes pressured Bahia's president using his brother, the Minister of Agriculture, and Matos continued to rule his "state within the state".

=== July revolts ===
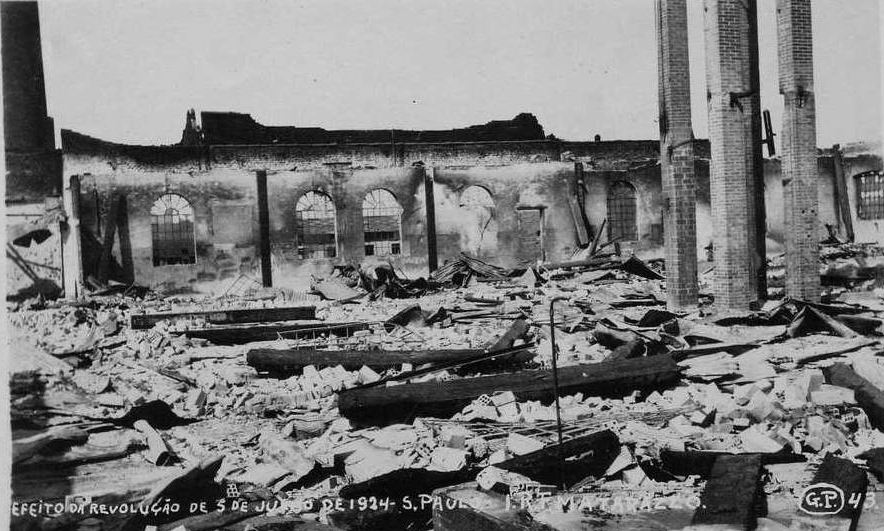
A Indústrias Reunidas Fábricas Matarazzo factory in ruins after the bombing of São Paulo

Amnesty was the common outcome in Brazilian republican military seditions. The Bernardes administration refused it to those responsible for the revolt of 5 July 1922 and the STF indicted 50 of them in December 1923. Eleven of them, fugitives, were the nucleus of a new armed conspiracy, the São Paulo Revolt, which emerged in July 1924. Rebel elements of the army and Public Force plunged the city of São Paulo into a prolonged urban combat. The leader of the movement, general Isidoro Dias Lopes, proclaimed himself head of a "Provisional Government". The revolutionary manifestos clarified that the movement was national in scope, not regional, accused Bernardes of despotism, and demanded his resignation. Military revolts spread to other states; in July alone, they broke out in Mato Grosso, Sergipe, Amazonas and Pará.

Censorship controlled news about the conflict, but it was "possible to see, between the lines of the newspapers that, despite remaining firmly at the helm, Bernardes is dangerously navigating through the obstacles of a military crisis that could spread all over the country". By 12 July, foreign diplomats were hearing rumors that he would resign. A boat moored at the back of the Catete Palace had a crew always on standby. In São Paulo, the factories stopped, hungry mobs looted stores, and the specter of a popular revolution loomed. Loyalist artillery indiscriminately bombarded rebel territory. At the end of the conflict, the city council counted 503 dead and 4,846 injured, of which two thirds were civilians. The government rejected humanitarian calls to halt the bombing.

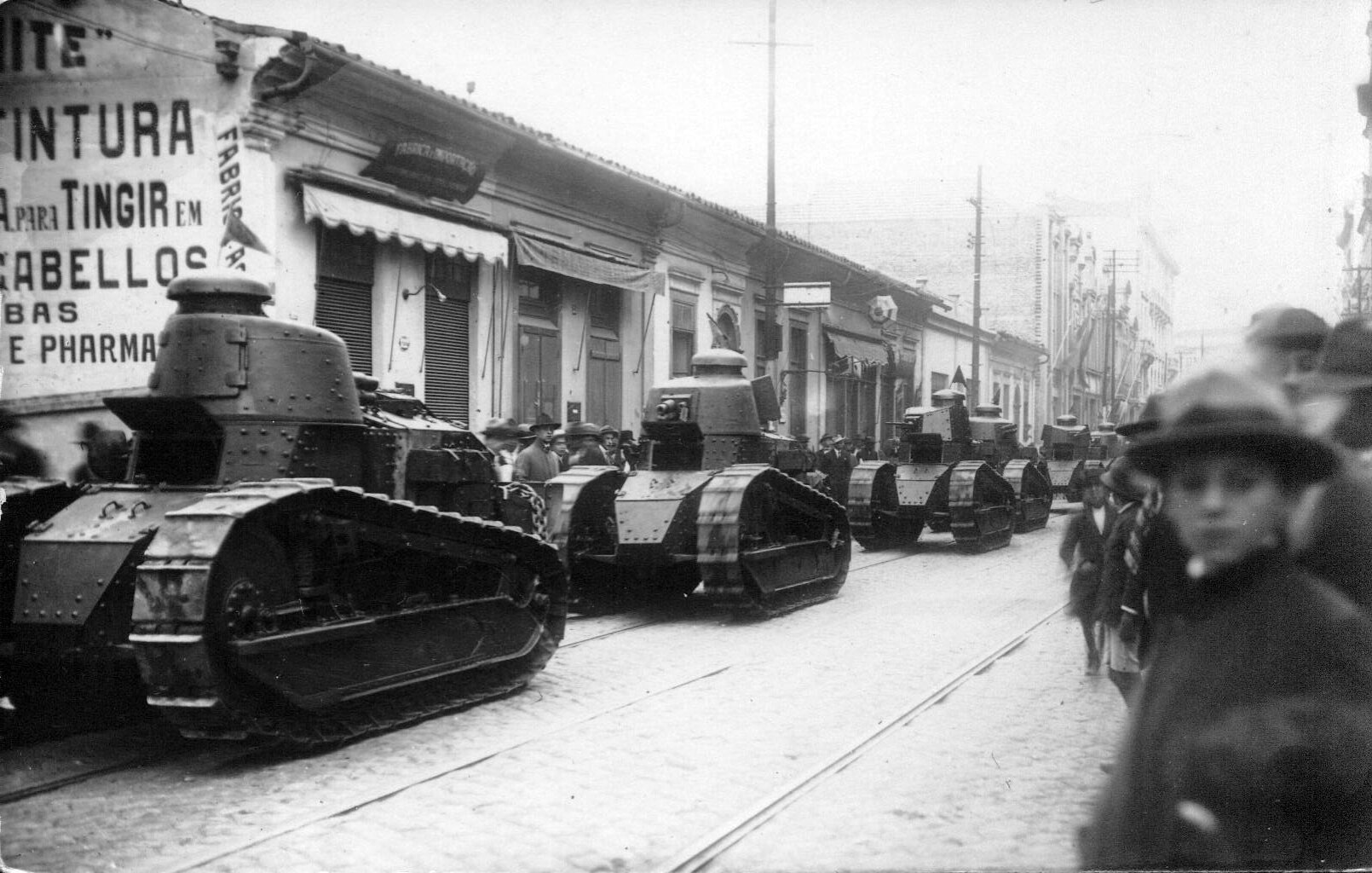
Army Renault FT-17 tanks parading in São Paulo

Writer Monteiro Lobato sent a letter to Bernardes after his birthday, on 9 August. After saying that none of Brazil's presidents was "less understood in their honest intentions", Lobato warned that "the mood of the Brazilian people is one of open revolt". After the rebels left São Paulo, on 27 July, "the legal troops parade through the city and the people do not hail them as liberators (...) Absolute indifference. German army entering Paris..." In his response, Bernardes partly blamed immigrants in the São Paulo working class for the "lack of a more prompt civic reaction".

The president spared no resources in combating tenentism and could not understand the hostility he received. In a letter to a friend, Bernardes wrote that "ambitious politicians and bad citizens have not left me time to work". Years later he declared that tenentism was a movement "without a known program or objectives other than those of a personal nature. They were revolts prepared even before I took over the government and I think they were aimed at me then". (Note: Interview with the newspaper A Noite, reproduced in, Francisco Moacir de Assunção Filho, 1924 - Delenda São Paulo: a cidade e a população vítimas das armas de guerra e das disputas políticas (2014), p. 113.) According to his "Manifesto to the Nation" of November 1924, the "real, unconfessed causes are the unruly ambition of power and the possession of the Public Treasury". Historians of tenentism recognized that there was indeed a political program in the movement, vaguely nationalist in character, demanding freedom of the press, secret voting and overcoming the old political oligarchies, of which Bernardes would be the icon, the "symbol of the perversion of the Republic".

=== The Prestes Column ===
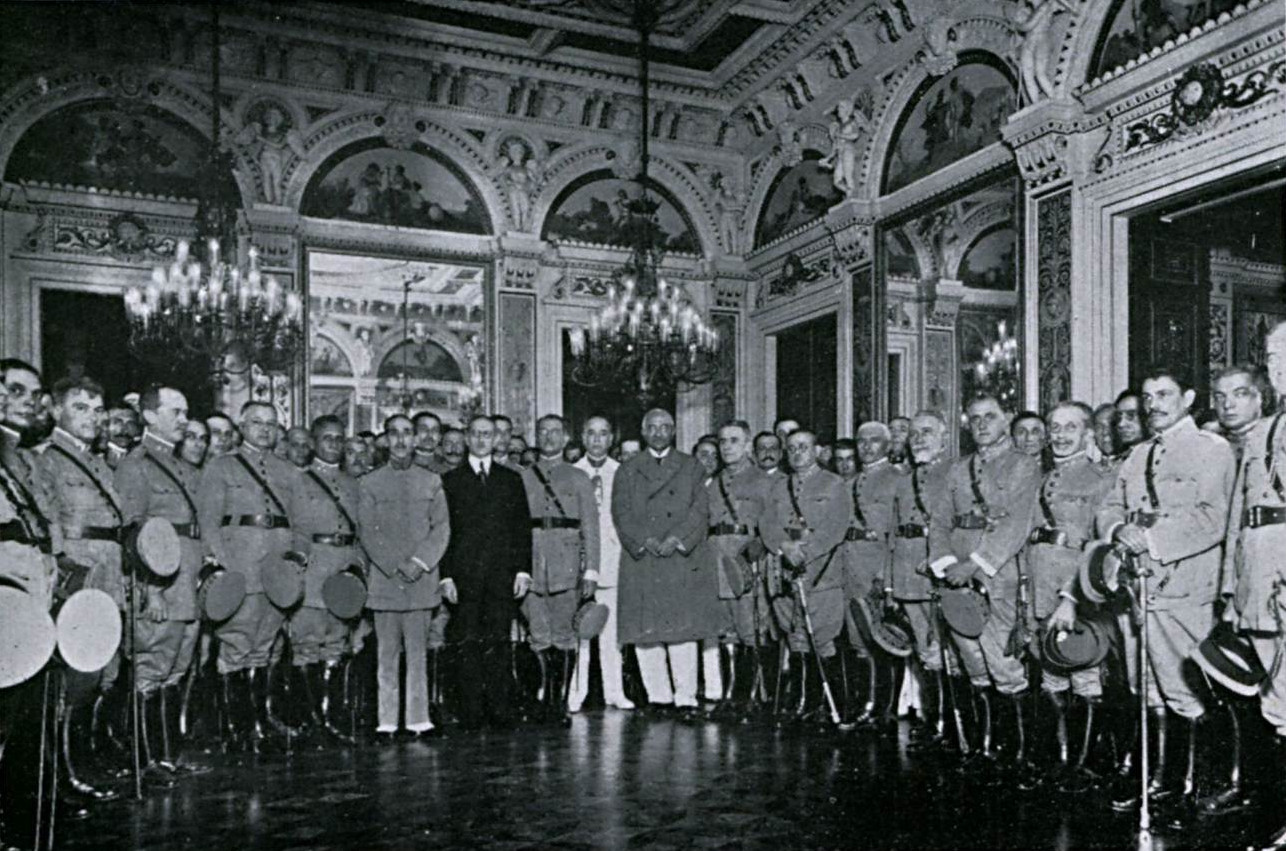
Loyalist army officers greeting Bernardes at the Catete Palace

On 4 November, conspirators in the Brazilian Navy took control of the battleship São Paulo, creating panic in the Catete Palace when the ship was spotted in an attack position. Bernardes, already a veteran of these crises, was not bothered: "everyone can leave if they want, including my family. I, however, will remain here in defense of the regime of which I am a representative". As a precautionary measure, the ship was almost out of ammunition. São Paulo sailed into exile. The war continued; the São Paulo rebels were waging the Paraná Campaign, and a new revolt emerged in Rio Grande do Sul in October. The union between these two rebel groups gave rise to the Prestes Column, which marched throughout the countryside, prolonging the fight until the beginning of the following presidential term.

Smaller revolts continued to break out, and many conspiracies were discovered in advance. The Prestes Column, with its persistence, discredited the central government and the army, but avoided the most populated areas and only attacked one large city, Teresina. Apart from the urban middle class, the tenentist rebels were isolated. The political class, rural and urban oligarchies, and high military ranks sided with the government to defend order. Bernardes remained in absolute control. The only organized opposition was in Congress, where it did not reach a quarter of the deputies. Congressmen congratulated the president for the "serene energy and imperturbable intrepidity" with which he crushed the revolts.

=== State of emergency ===
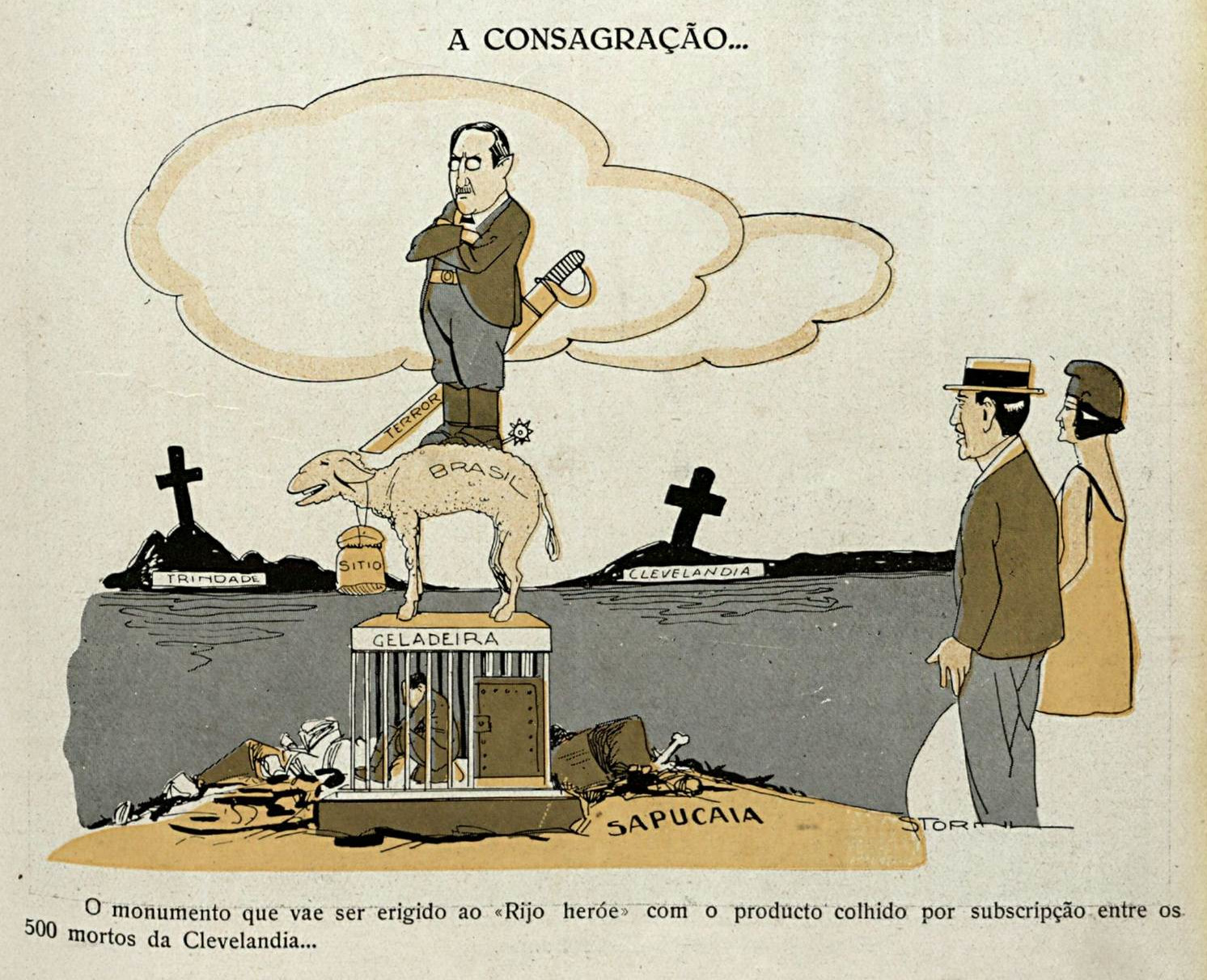
Anti-Bernardes satire: the state of emergency, terror, Trindade, Clevelândia and the "refrigerator" (an overcrowded prison cell in the Central Police)

Faced with instability, Bernardes preferred repression to conciliation. 1,287 of 1,460 days, 88.15% of his term, were spent with a state of emergency in force at some location in Brazil's territory, more than all his predecessors combined. (Note: 295 days under Floriano Peixoto, 268 days under Hermes da Fonseca, 132 days under Epitácio Pessoa, 121 days under Rodrigues Alves, 104 days under Prudente de Morais and 71 days under Venceslau Brás, for a total of 991 days between 1889 and 1922. Aragão, Isabel Lopez (2021). Identidade militar-revoltosa e exílio: perseguição, articulação e resistência (1922-1930) (PDF) (Thesis thesis). Programa de Pós-Graduação em História Social da Universidade do Estado do Rio de Janeiro. p. 105.) This measure suppressed individual guarantees and authorized coercive measures to stifle popular unrest and revolutionary acts. In his messages to Congress, Bernardes claimed that the measure was taken "unwillingly, but in defense of high national interests", to "prevent disorder, eliminating its causes", but the state of emergency would be nothing more than "a situation that can almost be compared to the constitutional regime under which many more advanced and free peoples normally live".

In a letter to Bueno Brandão, before taking office, he confided: "given the mental anarchy that we now observe, the tendency of the classes towards indiscipline and the social tendency to discredit authority, I considered it necessary to have a strong Police". Five days after taking office, he signed a decree reorganizing the police in the Federal District. The office of Chief of Police would no longer need to be held by a Law graduate and the Investigation and Political Security Inspectorate was transformed into the 4th Auxiliary Police Bureau, which had several sections with political police functions. Bernardes' personal archive contains reports from the 4th Bureau produced between March 1924 and November 1926, many of which are daily records of espionage of opponents and conspirators.

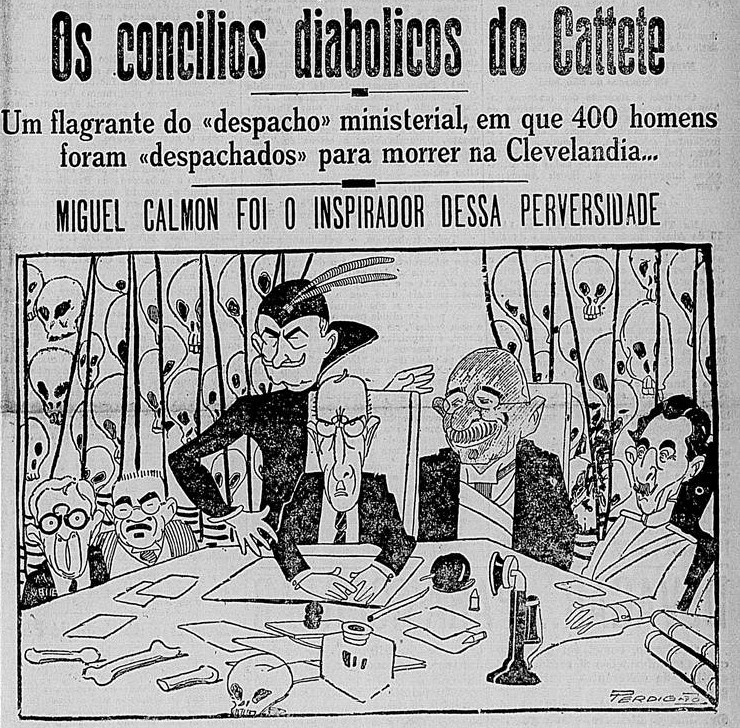
Bernardes, with marshal Fontoura at his side, being imagined as sending prisoners to Clevelândia (newspaper A Rua)

The two main figures of the repression were marshal Carneiro da Fontoura ("Marechal Escuridão"), chief of police, and major Carlos Reis, 4th Police Chief. Fontoura, considered a symbol of police discretion, would later lose his position due to his involvement with Jogo do Bicho. Under the marshal's orders, an "army of spies" monitored the opposition in the capital. Unions were raided and closed. Newspapers critical of the government had copies seized and newsrooms raided. Arrests and torture of rebels, supporters, suspects and their relatives were repeated throughout the country.

With overcrowded jails, the government resorted to prison ships and islands in Guanabara Bay. Taking advantage of the legislation on the state of emergency, which allowed the "exile to other places in the national territory", some received remote and isolated destinations: the island of Trindade, in the middle of the South Atlantic, and the penal colony of Clevelândia, on the border with French Guiana, where ill-treatment and tropical diseases killed around half of the deportees. Historian Carlo Romani even described the place as a concentration camp. The official report recorded 946 prisoners, of whom 491 died and 262 escaped. (Note: Journey to the Cleveland Colonial Nucleus, discussed in Brito, Edson Machado de (2008). Do sentido aos significados do presídio de Clevelândia do Norte: repressão, resistência e disputa política no debate da imprensa (PDF) (Dissertation thesis). Pontifícia Universidade Católica de São Paulo. p. 31. The most common diseases were bacillary dysentery, malaria and tuberculosis.) They were soldiers, civilians arrested for political reasons, including anarchists, petty criminals, small traders, minors and the unemployed.

=== Economy ===
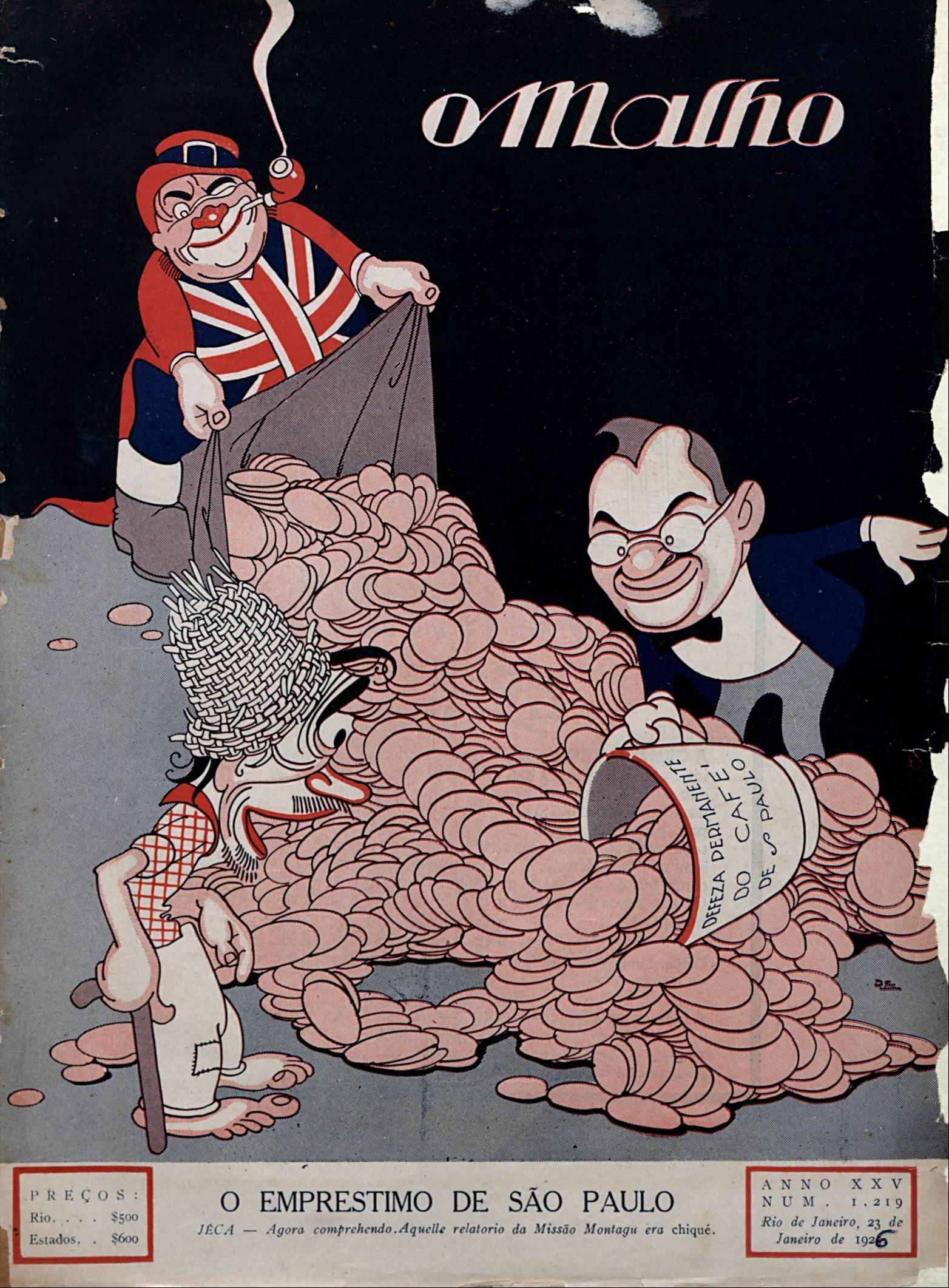
Cover of O Malho, 23 January 1926: British bankers and São Paulo's defense of coffee

The Bernardes government's economic platform promised to balance public finances, stabilize the exchange rate and create an independent central bank. Equilibrium in the trade balance would come from the permanent defense of coffee, the increase in other exports, such as cotton, and import substitution, including by the installation of a steel mill in Minas Gerais. The government instituted income tax for the first time in Brazil and from the first year onwards made drastic cuts in civil service wages and public works, including cutting investments against the drought in the Northeast made by the previous administration.

The central bank would be the Bank of Brazil, which received gold reserves from the Treasury. The bank's president, Cincinato Braga, and the Minister of Finance, Sampaio Vidal, were both from São Paulo, a perfect example of a "milk coffee" agreement. They used the bank's issuing capacity to defend coffee prices, against the preferences of orthodox Minas Gerais politicians. The 1923 coffee crop was more than twice as big as the previous one, the currency continued to depreciate, and the government sought a loan from London bankers. These had the bargaining power to impose a mission of experts.

The mission's recommendations were a scandal in the opposition press: privatizations, favors to foreign investors, dismissals of public servants and abandonment of the steel plant project and federal subsidies for the valorization of coffee. To guarantee the execution of the agreement, the British wanted the sale of public shares in the Bank of Brazil. On 2 March 1924, Bernardes was personally pressured by Edwin Samuel Montagu, head of the financial mission. He disagreed and, advised by the Minister of Finance, ended up agreeing. (Note: "Bernardes turned very red, moved easily in his chair, and grinned at me that they were only trying away for something on which we were in agreement". Montagu added that he was bluffing, and feared losing the case. Bernardes ended up agreeing to the sale of Central do Brasil. Fritsch 1988, pp. 96, 239.) Before the proposal regarding the Bank of Brazil reached Congress, the British government restricted external loans, throwing away months of negotiations. Still, the Montagu Mission inspired many of the reforms of the remainder of the quadrennium.

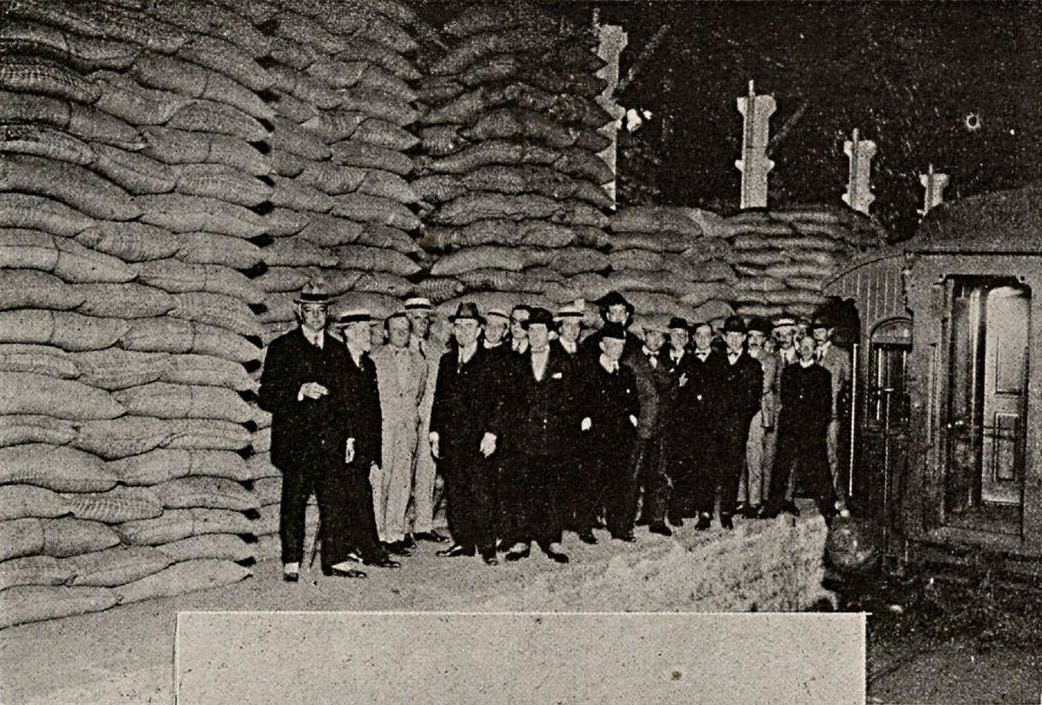
Coffee stocks in Campinas, May 1924

Inflation continued to rise and spending on the military revolts exceeded the legal limit for the Bank of Brazil's monetary issues. At the end of 1924, the orthodox advisors convinced Bernardes to carry out a deflationary and recessive adjustment, the only option in the absence of external credit. The Bank of Brazil carried out a drastic monetary contraction and the government further reduced the budget deficit. Cincinato Braga and Sampaio Vidal were dismissed and the responsibility for protecting coffee prices was transferred to São Paulo. This was a sudden reversal of the alliance with the agro-export sectors, wearing down the president with São Paulo. Bernardes defended himself: "it would be absurd to attribute to me an attitude against coffee farming". What he was against was "to artificially and dramatically increase the price of the product at the expense (...) of the Union's finances, the national economy and public tranquility".

The orthodox adjustment contracted industrial production, which stagnated at the 1924 level, already low due to the fighting in São Paulo. Imports of capital goods fell and bankruptcies occurred above average levels. The goals were achieved: appreciation of the exchange rate and inflation control. This was not only due to the government, but also to the positive trends in international trade. The government's fiscal and monetary discipline convinced New York bankers to grant a loan in 1926. The exchange rate of pence per mil-réis, which had fallen to 4.84 in November 1923, peaked at 7.75 in July 1926. The cost of living in Rio de Janeiro, as a percentage of the 1939 value, was 67 in 1922, rose to 114.6 until 1925 and fell to 93.9 in 1926. Brazil's Gross Domestic Product (GDP) grew at an annual average of 3.7% in the quadrennium 1922–1926.

=== Legislation ===
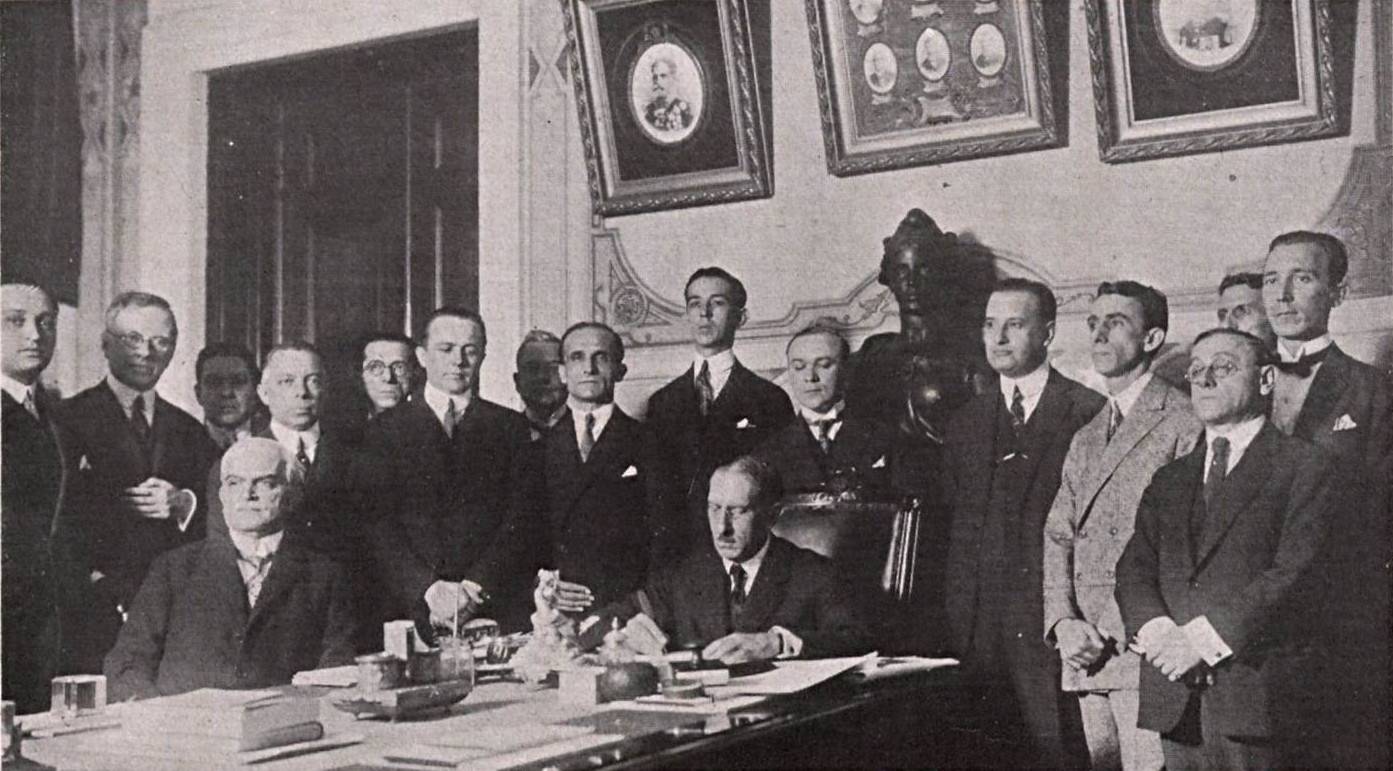
Signing of the vacation law for commercial workers

Of the governments at the end of the First Brazilian Republic, that of Bernardes was simultaneously the one that most intervened in labor relations and most repressed the labor movement. Approaching some worker leaders, Bernardes enacted the Eloy Chaves Law, considered the origin of social security in Brazil, and several other labor laws, although modest and often circumvented by employers. In press legislation, Bernardes appreciated Senator Adolfo Gordo's bill, enacted in October 1923, for protecting "the dignity of journalism" against "the professionals of defamation" and "the exploiters of scandal". Among other provisions, the decree established prior restraint and the right of reply, and determined that the "director or main editor will be considered the author of all writings".

In education, the "Rocha Vaz Reform", enacted in January 1925, created the National Department of Education, considered by some authors as a precursor to the current Ministry of Education, although its attributions were limited, and included moral and civic education in the secondary education program. The government agreed with the Catholic Church that political, economic and social issues were, deep down, moral. On 4 May of the previous year, the president attended the golden jubilee of D. Arcoverde, archbishop of Rio de Janeiro, with his entire ministry, making public the rapprochement of the Church with the Brazilian State.

The first and only reform of the Constitution of 1891 was approved in September 1926. The changes to the constitution dealt, among other topics, with the presidential veto on bills, the preparation of budgets, the possibility of restricting international trade, deportation, passports and the exploitation of mineral deposits by foreigners, the appeals system of the federal judiciary, habeas corpus and cases of federal intervention. By the fifth paragraph of article 60, "No judicial recourse is permitted, to Federal or local justice, against intervention in the States [and] the declaration of a state of emergency". The result was a strengthening of the Executive and central power.

The amendments were discussed in the midst of a state of emergency, military revolts and presidential succession. Bernardes reversed the idea that the crisis would justify not changing the republican political status. The initiative came from him, who hosted the review committee meetings at Catete. Historian Hélio Silva sought to refute accusations that the reform was promoted to oppress the opposition: it was only achieved at the end of Bernardes' term, its more specific conditions for federal intervention made it difficult for subsequent governments to apply the measure, and its narrower definition of habeas corpus was normal in other countries. The reform's main changes persisted in the following constitutions.

=== Foreign policy ===
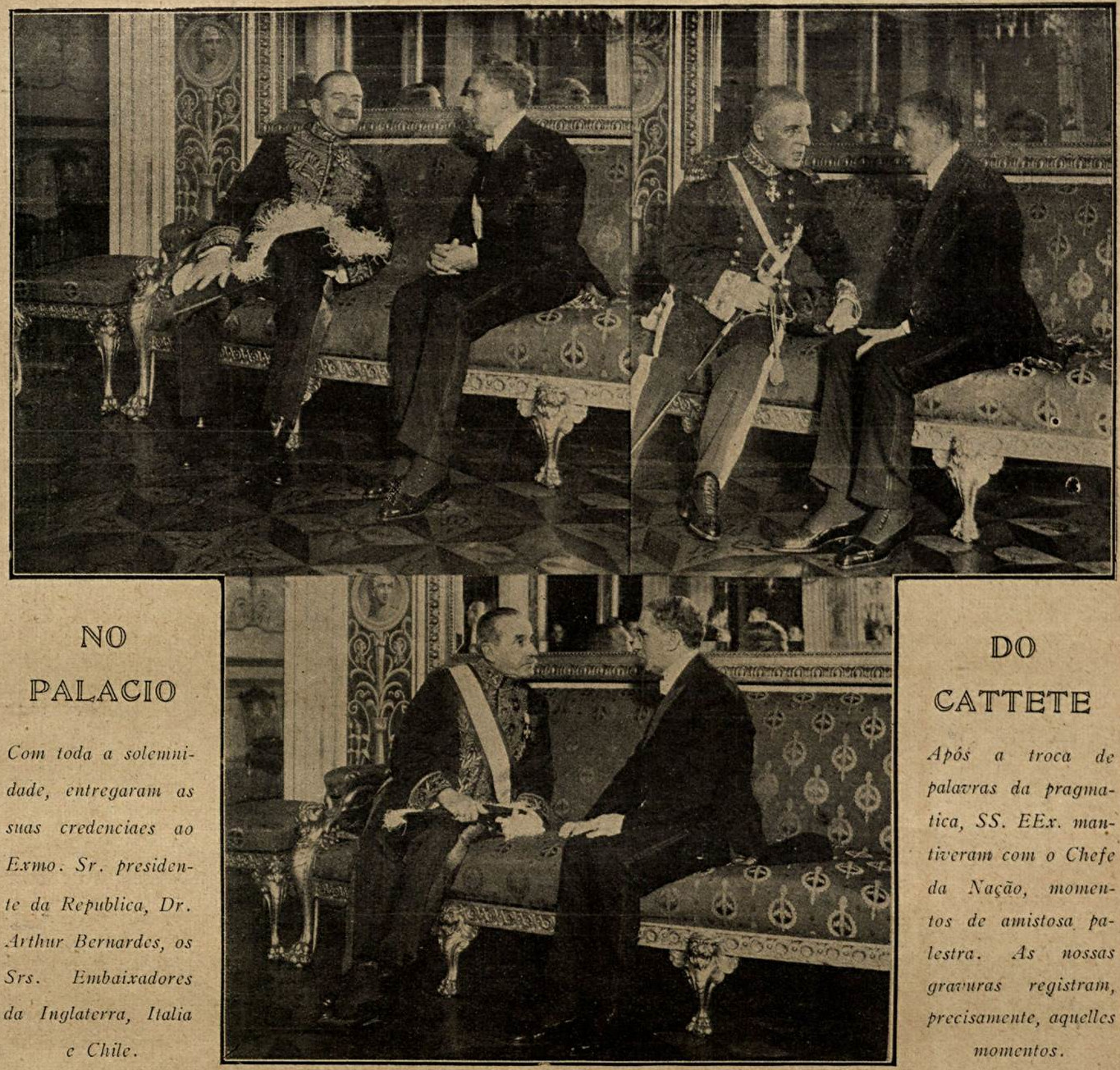
Conferences with the ambassadors of the United Kingdom, Italy and Chile

The biggest change in Brazilian foreign policy during the Bernardes administration was the withdrawal from the League of Nations, on 10 June 1926. This was the culmination and defeat of Brazil's diplomatic efforts to obtain a permanent seat on the institution's Deliberative Council, a claim that can be compared, in the 21st century, to Brazil's ambition at a permanent seat on the United Nations Security Council. Afrânio de Melo Franco represented Brazil in the League, in Geneva, where Brazilian representation was elevated, at great cost, to the status of embassy. The country's image abroad, however, was harmed by internal repressive measures. In July 1924, the government war effort killed Italian citizens, destroyed British property, and censored American journalists.

To put pressure on the Council, Brazil threatened to veto Germany's entry, and finally, it threatened to discredit the League with its withdrawal, which the country ended up having to do when it was not taken seriously. Bernardes overestimated Brazil's importance, as Germany's diplomatic normalization in the Locarno Treaties was a much greater concern for the European powers. Brazilian rhetoric criticized the "Europeanization" of the organization, claiming to represent the American continent, but diplomats from Latin American countries called for the veto to be lifted. Relations with these countries were out of step, visible in the disagreements regarding disarmament at the Fifth Pan-American Conference. With neighboring countries (Argentina and Uruguay), Brazil exchanged information regarding the conflict in Rio Grande do Sul.

The writings on the subject were based mainly on the president's opponents, concluding that Brazil's withdrawal from the League was a diplomatic fiasco, in which Bernardes, driven by considerations of internal public opinion, imposed his will against the recommendation of diplomats. More recent studies argue that the fiasco was also of the international system as a whole and the president was informed about geopolitics (through correspondence with rear admiral Augusto Carlos de Souza e Silva) and wanted to show that Brazil had its own opinion abroad.

== Presidential succession ==
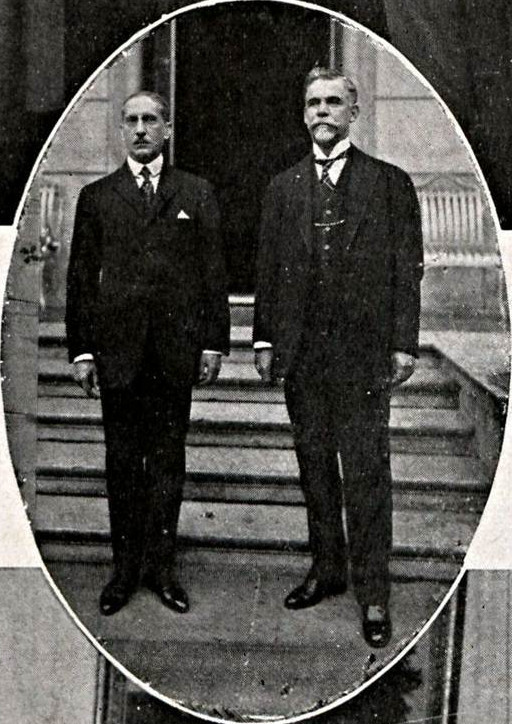
Bernardes and Washington Luís

The transition of power from Artur Bernardes to Washington Luís, on 15 November 1926, was peaceful, very different from what had occurred four years earlier. Catete, Minas Gerais and São Paulo were able to decide the successor with only rhetorical resistance. Possible enemies were demobilized by repression. The only problem came from Fernando de Melo Viana, the president of Minas Gerais. Viana even imagined himself as Bernardes' candidate for president, criticizing Washington Luís' candidacy and flirting with the opposition by suggesting an amnesty for the rebels. The solution was to nominate him as a candidate for vice president.

Melo Viana was the successor of Raul Soares, who died in 1924, in the government of Minas Gerais and leadership of the PRM. Bernardes, away from Minas Gerais and distracted by national political turmoil, was unable to control the succession in his home state. His "era of personal power" was not perpetuated in the PRM, which returned to the Tarasca collegiate system. Melo Viana chose as his successor a rival of Bernardes, deputy Antônio Carlos Ribeiro de Andrada, leader of the majority in the Chamber of Deputies. To the astonishment of his supporters, the president calmly accepted the appointment.

Washington Luís' inauguration took place under a state of emergency, as had been the case in 1922. Bernardes did not participate in the ceremony. The first acts of the new government eased political tensions: the government progressively ended the state of emergency, released political prisoners and suspended censorship. The Prestes Column went into exile. There was, however, no amnesty.

== Post-presidency ==
=== Senator (1927–1930) ===
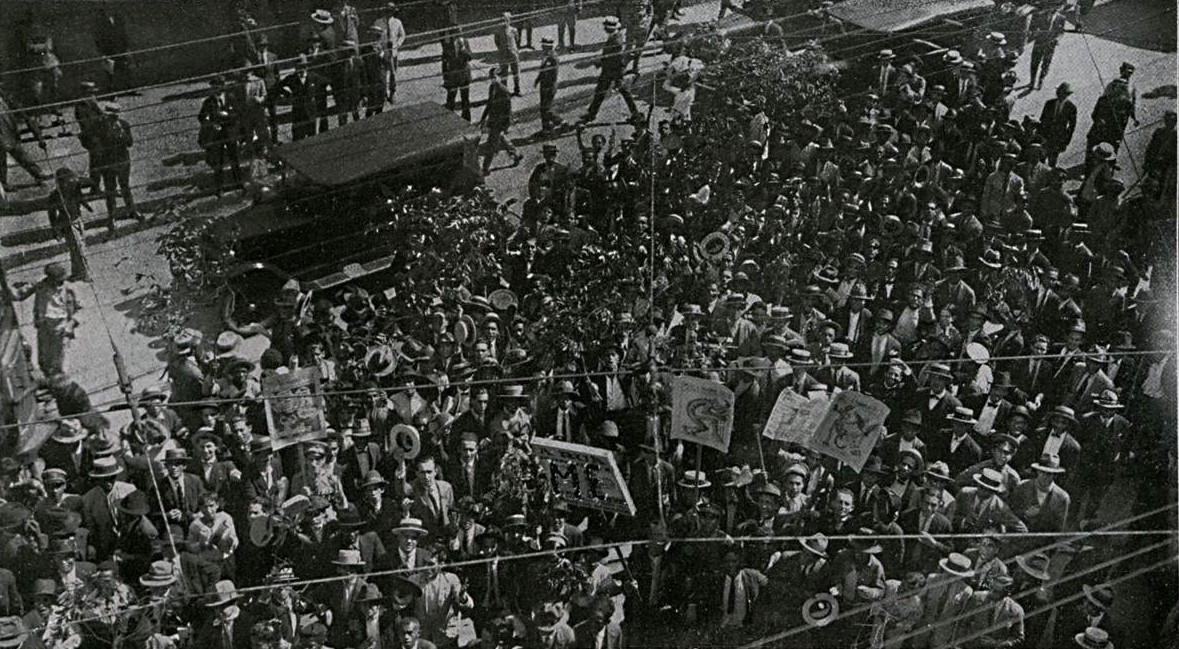
A demonstration in Rio de Janeiro against Bernardes' inauguration as senator

Just two days after Luís' inauguration, a special edition of O Globo denounced the "mud volcanoes" of the past administration. The press went for revenge, unleashing satires and caricatures against the former president. The accusations were serious: the Clevelândia case finally came to light, shocking public opinion. The Conrado Niemeyer case, a businessman who died in the Central Police Building in 1925, had a lot of impact. The newspaper O Combate, from São Paulo, mentioned the "new rich of Bernardism", the heads of the political police enriched through illegal means. O Globo accused the presidential group of having used censorship in favor of its private interests, such as the ban on reporting the fire at the Gávea fabric factory, of which Bernardes was one of the main shareholders.

Congress reduced the period of ineligibility for former presidents, from six to three months after their term of office, to allow Bernardes to run for senator in the February 1927 elections, filling the vacancy left by Antônio Carlos. Bernardes was elected with just under 175 thousand votes, without a competitor, but the results were challenged in the Powers Commission. He finally took office at the Monroe Palace on 25 May, protected by a huge police guard. The strongest security scheme was from Tijuca, where his brother Olegário lived, to the Monroe Palace, to mislead the crowd that intended to boo the delegation. Shortly before, Bernardes had declared to the Belo Horizonte press that the people of Rio were "carnivalesque" and lacking in civility. The former president appeared on the side of Botafogo and entered through the back door. In the Senate, he was covered in confetti and white dahlias, cheered by hundreds of supporters, and spoke in defense of his achievements.

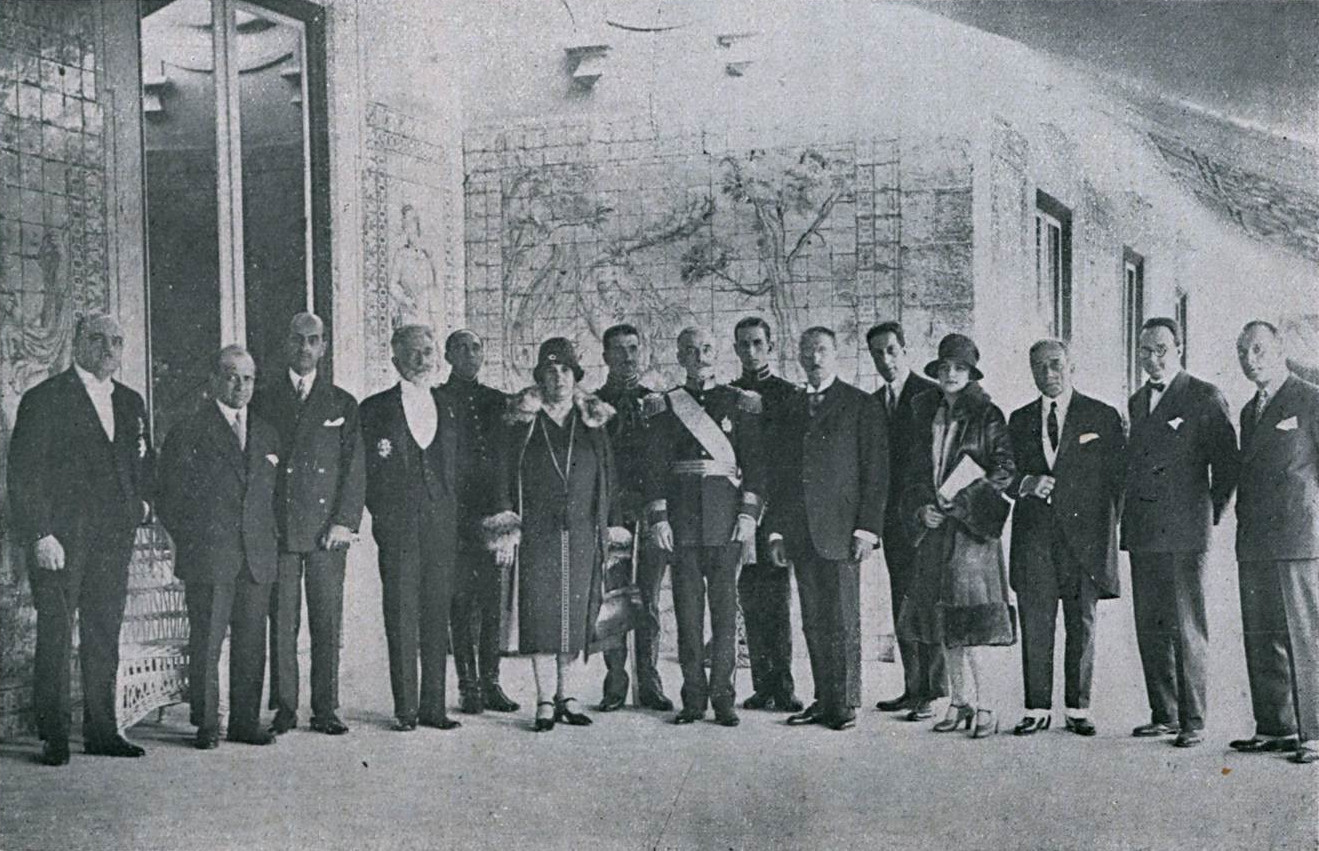
Bernardes with Óscar Carmona, president of Portugal

The following morning he embarked under police escort for Europe, where he spent a period of vacation, living in Paris at the house of his friend Lineu de Paula Machado and visiting several countries. In May 1929 he began to participate in the work of the Senate. Only two of his speeches were highlighted: rebutting criticisms from Antônio Azeredo and debating with Irineu Machado. Against Azeredo, who recalled the detention of "citizens of all classes, condemned by hatred and caprice", Bernardes read police records from the time of the state of emergency.

The succession of Antônio Carlos in the government of Minas Gerais divided the PRM: Bernardes, Melo Viana and Venceslau Brás launched themselves as pre-candidates in 1929. Bernardes ended up accepting Olegário Maciel, the conciliation candidate nominated by the state president. Melo Viana refused and campaigned against the Liberal Alliance, the coalition of which the PRM and its equivalents in Rio Grande do Sul and Paraíba were part of for the 1930 presidential election. The party structure set up by Bernardes experienced its first split. His opponent in the federal election was Júlio Prestes, from São Paulo, Washington Luís' candidate. It was not a personal issue; Prestes admired Bernardes.

=== Revolution of 1930 ===
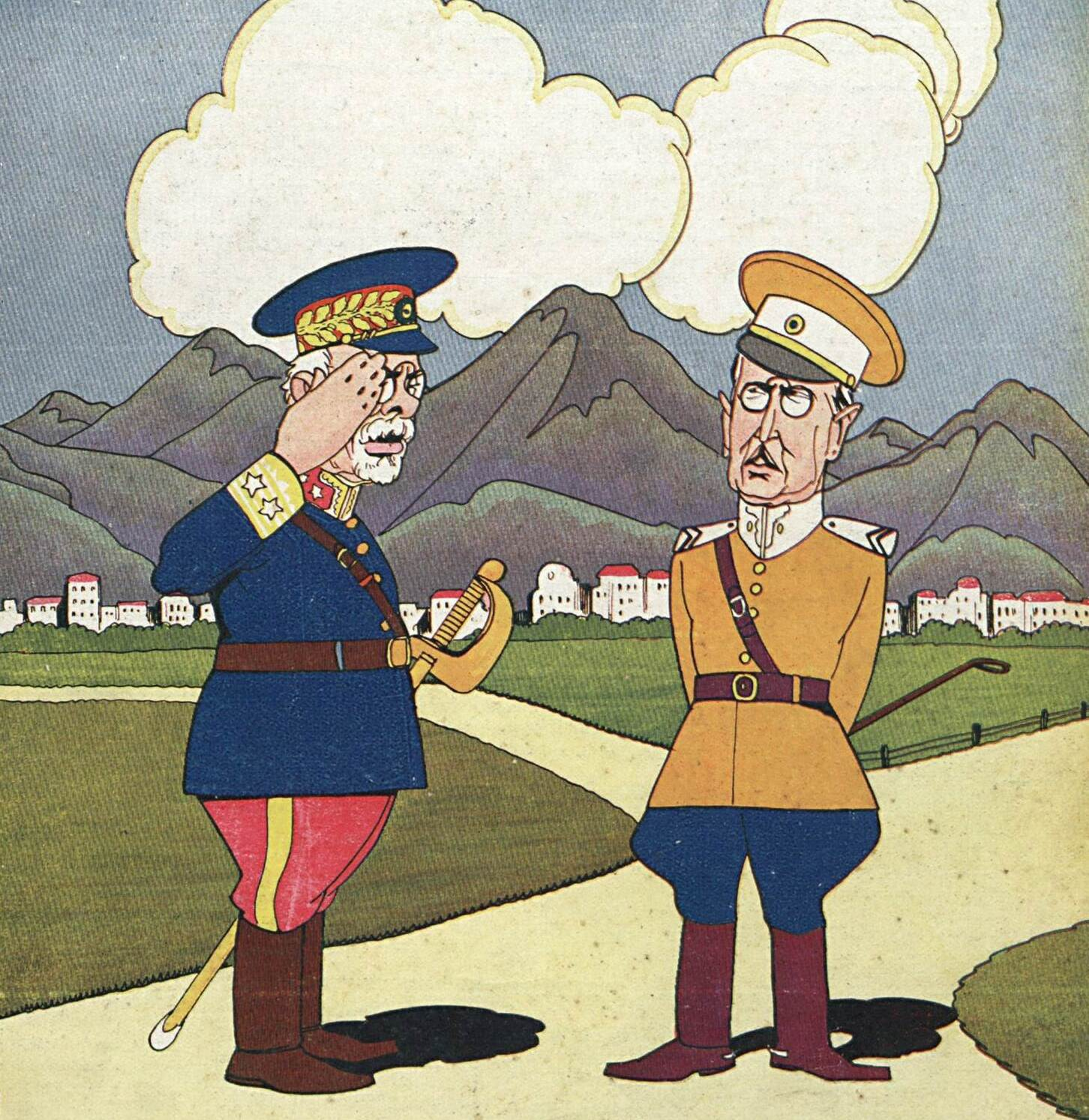
"General" Olegário Maciel and "lieutenant" Bernardes (Careta magazine)

With the Liberal Alliance defeated by Júlio Prestes in March–April, PRM leaders were convinced by Minas Gerais deputy Virgílio de Melo Franco and Rio Grande do Sul politician Batista Luzardo to join a future armed movement against the government, the Revolution of 1930. According to deputy Daniel Serapião de Carvalho, Bernardes was the most difficult Minas Gerais politician to win over to the revolutionary cause, but he remained faithful to it until the end. Bernardes was still the most prestigious member of his party and helped drag along undecided party members.

Luís Aranha, brother of Oswaldo Aranha and Secretary of the Interior of Rio Grande do Sul, visited Bernardes in April to inform him of the plans. Aranha reported that the former president left a very strong impression and had no ideological reason to support the revolution, but considered it necessary and inevitable. Bernardes proposed organizing a council of former presidents after taking power. Historian Helena Bomeny believes that Bernardes participated in the revolution to restore the old Minas Gerais-São Paulo relationship, which Washington Luís had betrayed.

Bernardes took the risks of conspiring and was the only leader to participate in the revolution until the end. This made him a temporary ally of the former tenentist rebels. At the beginning of the armed movement, in October, Bernardes was in Belo Horizonte, having been alongside Olegário Maciel when he ordered the assault on the 12th Infantry Regiment and influenced him to accept the transfer of power from the Provisional Governing Junta to Getúlio Vargas.

The new regime dissolved the National Congress, ending Bernardes' term as senator. The revolution momentarily enhanced his image. Upon returning to Viçosa, he was visited by the revolutionary commander João Alberto Lins de Barros, a veteran of the Prestes Column. In the Rio newspapers, the tenentists identified Bernardes with the oligarchic yoke and regionalism that the revolution should get rid of. The disillusionment was quick. The party for Minas Gerais politicians at the Jóquei Clube do Rio de Janeiro, on 29 December, was cold and without speeches.

=== PRM's decline ===
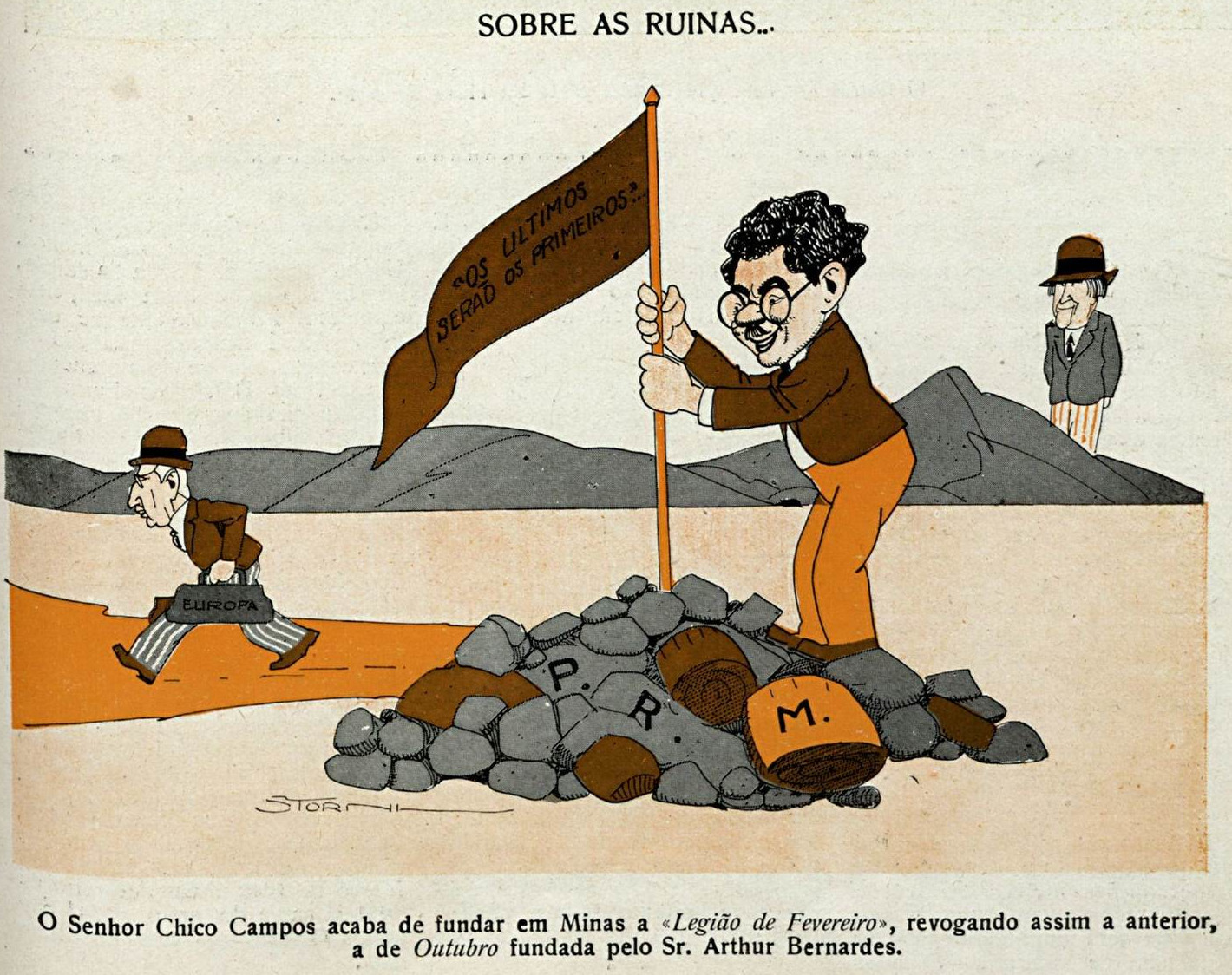
Francisco Campos triumphs over the PRM while Bernardes heads to Europe (Careta magazine)

The period after 1930 would see the rise of the next generation of Minas Gerais politicians, which Bernardes' followers could not prevent. In November 1930, Olegário Maciel dismissed three Bernardist state secretaries. At 80 years old, Maciel was influenced by the rising figures who needed to reduce Bernardes' power — the "Mountain Bloc" of Francisco Campos (federal Minister of Education), Gustavo Capanema and Amaro Lanari. Francisco Campos had been introduced to politics as a state and then federal deputy by Bernardes himself, who saw Campos as a traitor.

All of his mayoral nominations were ignored. President Vargas invited Bernardes to head the Brazilian embassy in Paris, who refused, realizing his enemies were lurking. In 1931, 80% of the PRM's municipal directorates were incorporated into the October Legion, later Liberal Legion of Minas Gerais. It included Venceslau Brás, Olegário Maciel and Antônio Carlos, but not Bernardes. The Legion's ideology was reminiscent of tenentist criticisms of Bernardism.

Olegário Maciel announced the absorption of the PRM by the new party, but Bernardes denied: "this depends on its directors, who have not met for many years". Therefore, he called on party members to choose a new leadership. The party was reduced to a minority faction led by Bernardes, bringing together some figures such as Mário Brant, Djalma Pinheiro Chagas, Ovídio de Andrade, Daniel de Carvalho, Afrânio and Virgílio de Melo Franco. In Bernardes' opinion, "the defections came to strengthen the party, purging it of the bad elements, of those who do not know how to be loyal".

On 18 August 1931, Bernardes and other PRM members were detained at the party's convention in Belo Horizonte. They were blamed for a "mistake", as the federal government defined it: an attempted coup by the army organized by Oswaldo Aranha, Vargas' Minister of Justice, to install Virgílio de Melo Franco as governor in Olegário Maciel's place. Vargas intended to overthrow Maciel through the PRM and later get rid of the PRM itself. Maciel remained in power thanks to the loyalty of the state's Public Force. In February 1932, the party reached an agreement with the dominant faction, unifying Minas Gerais politics into the Social Nationalist Party (PSN). Dubbed the "nameless party", the agreement did not last two months.

=== Constitutionalist Revolution ===
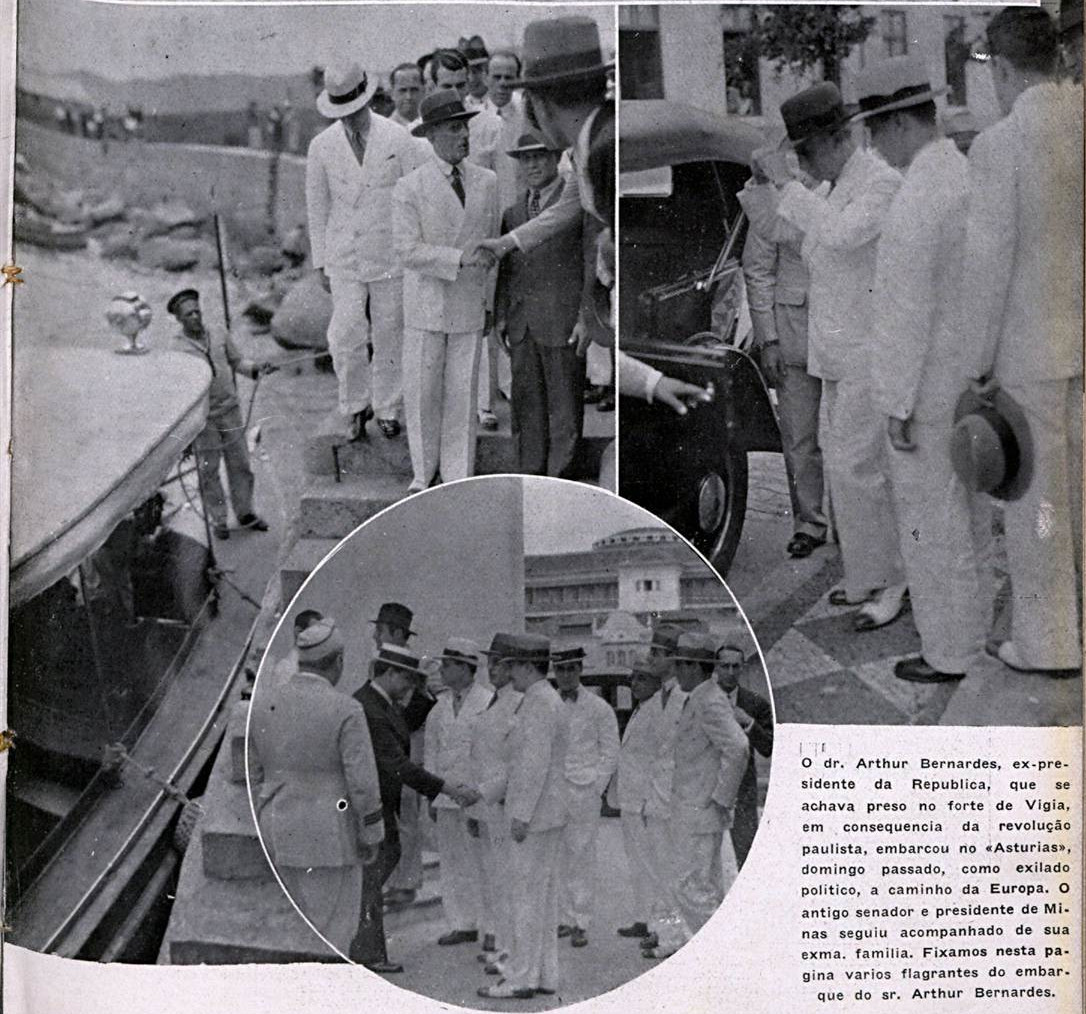
The Bernardes family going into exile in 1932

It is not surprising, therefore, that Bernardes took part in the plotting of the Constitutionalist Revolution of 1932, which began in São Paulo. Its goals were the ousting of Vargas, whose authority he considered illegal, and Olegário Maciel. On 8 August, Bernardes published a manifesto: "As for me, I stay with São Paulo, because the civic soul of Brazil has been transported there today". In this he had to make an effort to improve his image with São Paulo politicians. Constitutionalist Leven Vampré used the bombing of São Paulo as an example of the federal government's disregard for the state in the past, even without glorifying the rebellion itself.

Bernardes tried to revolt the Public Force of Minas Gerais, without success. Mayors and farmers in the Viçosa region accepted his leadership in a war effort, in which they recruited volunteers and purchased weapons, uniforms and food. Government troops suppressed this militia and Bernardes went on hiding, spending a night on each farm. Investigators arrested him in a hut in the woods, with torn clothes and a revolver on his waist. He did not resist arrest, but asked to spend another three days in Viçosa and continue to Belo Horizonte without an escort. He was informed that he was not a "higher authority" and was sent on a train to Rio de Janeiro.

Imprisoned in the capital, Bernardes, together with his sons and other relatives, passed through the islands of Cobras and Rijo, and on the latter he gave a statement assuming full responsibility for his revolt. On 1 November he was transferred to Fort Vigia. Like other leaders of the revolution, he had his political rights revoked for three years and was sent into exile on 3 December. The following day, he took a boat to the Maritime Police pier to board the ship Asturias. A crowd faced the police to cheer his departure, which Hélio Silva cited as proof of his accumulated prestige. However, the boarding of his family members, at other piers, was violent: his wife and daughters were attacked by supporters of the tenentists and Artur Bernardes Filho was injured by a bullet. With Bernardes in Lisbon and other leaders removed, the PRM was left with no leadership.

=== Constituent Assembly and Estado Novo ===
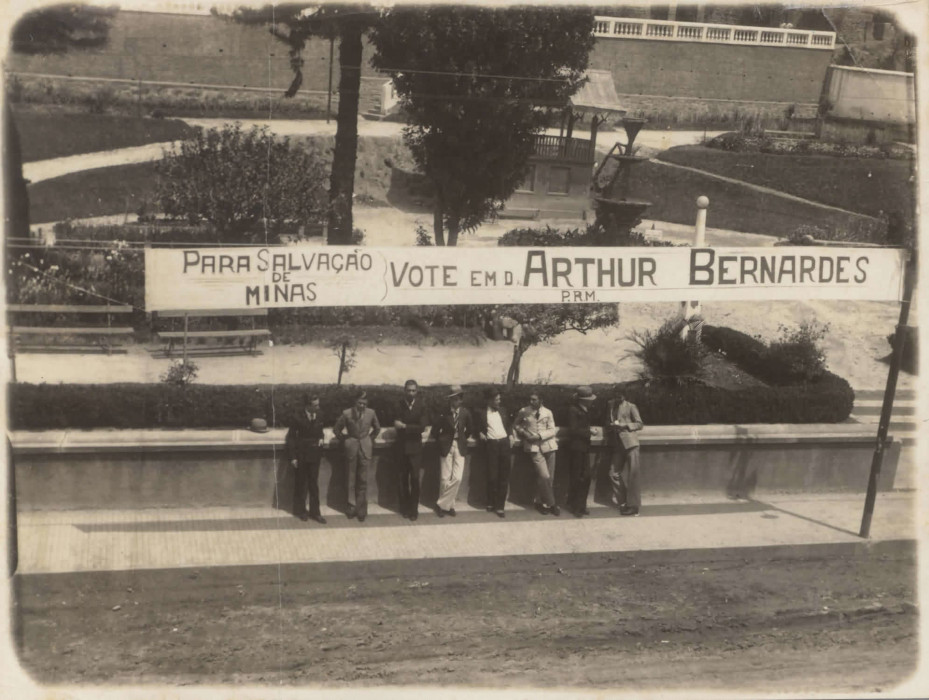
PRM's electoral campaign in 1934

Getúlio Vargas convened a National Constituent Assembly in 1933 and decreed a general amnesty on 28 May of the following year, making Bernardes eligible. Vargas was indirectly re-elected by Congress in an election in which Bernardes received one of the 71 opposition votes. The positive demonstrations upon his arrival in Belo Horizonte, on 21 August, were even reported by Estado de Minas, the official newspaper of the Progressive Party (PP), led by federal intervener Benedito Valadares, to which the PRM was in opposition. The party elected 14 of 48 state deputies and 11 federal deputies, with the rest belonging to the PP. Bernardes, honorary president of the PRM and elected on both lists, opted for the Chamber of Deputies, which began its works on 3 May 1935. Bernardes planned with other regional oppositionists (Borges de Medeiros, Cincinato Braga, Sampaio Correia and Otávio Mangabeira) a national party.

As a deputy, Bernardes opposed the National Security Law, was one of the few oppositionists to fully support the declaration of a state of emergency after the Communist Uprising and was radically opposed to the Itabira Iron Ore Company, whose case was still controversial, proposing that the government declare the contract expired, as it was harmful to Brazil's interests. In Minas Gerais politics, the intervener Valadares was accused of police violence against PRM candidates in the 1936 municipal elections. Bernardes met Valadares twice in Rio, but did not want conciliation. Flores da Cunha, the federal intervener of Rio Grande do Sul, advised him that the agreement would only be a maneuver against the president of the Chamber of Deputies, Antônio Carlos. At the end of the year, ten of the fourteen PRM state deputies joined an agreement with Valadares and were therefore accused of "deserters" and "defectors" by Bernardes.

For the 1938 presidential election, Bernardes chaired the executive committee of the Brazilian Democratic Union, created on 10 June to launch the opposition candidate Armando de Sales Oliveira. Such negotiations were interrupted by the 1937 coup d'état, which installed Vargas' as dictator with the Estado Novo and closed the National Congress. Bernardes, without a term, was threatened with exile (which was imposed on Artur Bernardes Filho in 1938) and restricted in his movement: first to just Rio de Janeiro and Viçosa and, finally, at the beginning of 1939, only his farm in Viçosa. In August, after informing the Federal District police chief, Filinto Müller, that he was going to Rio de Janeiro to take care of his health, he was no longer confined. Bernardes stayed away from politics, apart from private conversations and discreet negotiations, but signed the Manifesto dos Mineiros in 1943, a declaration in favor of redemocratization in Brazil. After reading the manifesto's final version, which mentioned "the oppression of states of emergency of dubious legitimacy and long duration", Bernardes tried to withdraw his signature.

=== Fourth Brazilian Republic ===
Portrait as deputy in 1951

After the ousting of Getúio Vargas in 1945, Bernardes participated in the provisional committee of the National Democratic Union (UDN), formed by opponents of the regime, but left to found his own party, the Republican Party (PR), which he presided over until his death in 1955. The PR "was conflated (...) with the figure of its creator", much more Bernardist than the PRM had been. With little national projection, the party was the third political force in Minas Gerais, where it lived in coalitions with the two largest parties, the UDN and the Social Democratic Party (PSD). At the national level, the PR supported Eduardo Gomes, from the UDN, in the 1945 presidential election. Ironically, Eduardo Gomes was one of the former tenentist leaders. In the 1950 presidential election, the PR supported Cristiano Machado, from the PSD.

In the elections for the new Constituent Assembly, Bernardes was elected with 8,548 votes, the least voted of the six PR deputies from Minas Gerais. As a federal deputy, after 1946, he was elected president of the National Security Commission. With just over nine thousand votes in the 1950 election, he was only the party's third substitute, taking over the incumbents' seats several times in the 1951–1955 legislature. Interestingly, he never returned to the Senate, the traditional destination of former presidents and governors. When asked by journalist Paulino de Oliveira, Bernardes replied that he could not afford the election expenses. But Artur Bernardes Filho was a senator for Minas Gerais.

Throughout this final period of his political career, in the 40s and 50s, Bernardes participated in the campaign for Brazil's monopoly on oil, which would result in the founding of Petrobras. In April 1948, he became one of the honorary presidents of the Center for Studies and Defense of Petroleum and the National Economy (CEDPEN). The campaign was persecuted by president Eurico Gaspar Dutra and included military personnel, students, public figures, intellectuals and communists. Also in 1948, Bernardes opposed the creation of the International Institute of the Amazon Hyleia, which according to him, would result in the internationalization of the Amazon. In the 1954 elections, almost at the age of 80, Bernardes was the second most voted of the five federal deputies from the PR, with 21,761 votes.

== Death ==
Bernardes died at 13:45 of a myocardial infarction, in the company of his family and the Capuchin friar Cassiano de Vila Rosa, on 23 March 1955, less than two months after the start of work as federal deputy. The procession was accompanied by distinguished politicians and planes from the Brazilian Air Force. In a wreath of flowers left beside his coffin, an uncomfortable and possibly ironic memory was written: "the survivors of Clevelândia ask for forgiveness for having risen up against such an honest government and such a worthy president". Bernardes lay in state at the Chamber of Deputies and was later buried in the São João Batista Cemetery. It was the end of a 51-year long political career. The cult to Bernardes' image still gave the PR survival until the extinction of the old political parties by Institutional Act No. 2, already during the military dictatorship in Brazil, in 1965.

== Ideology and image ==
=== Personality ===
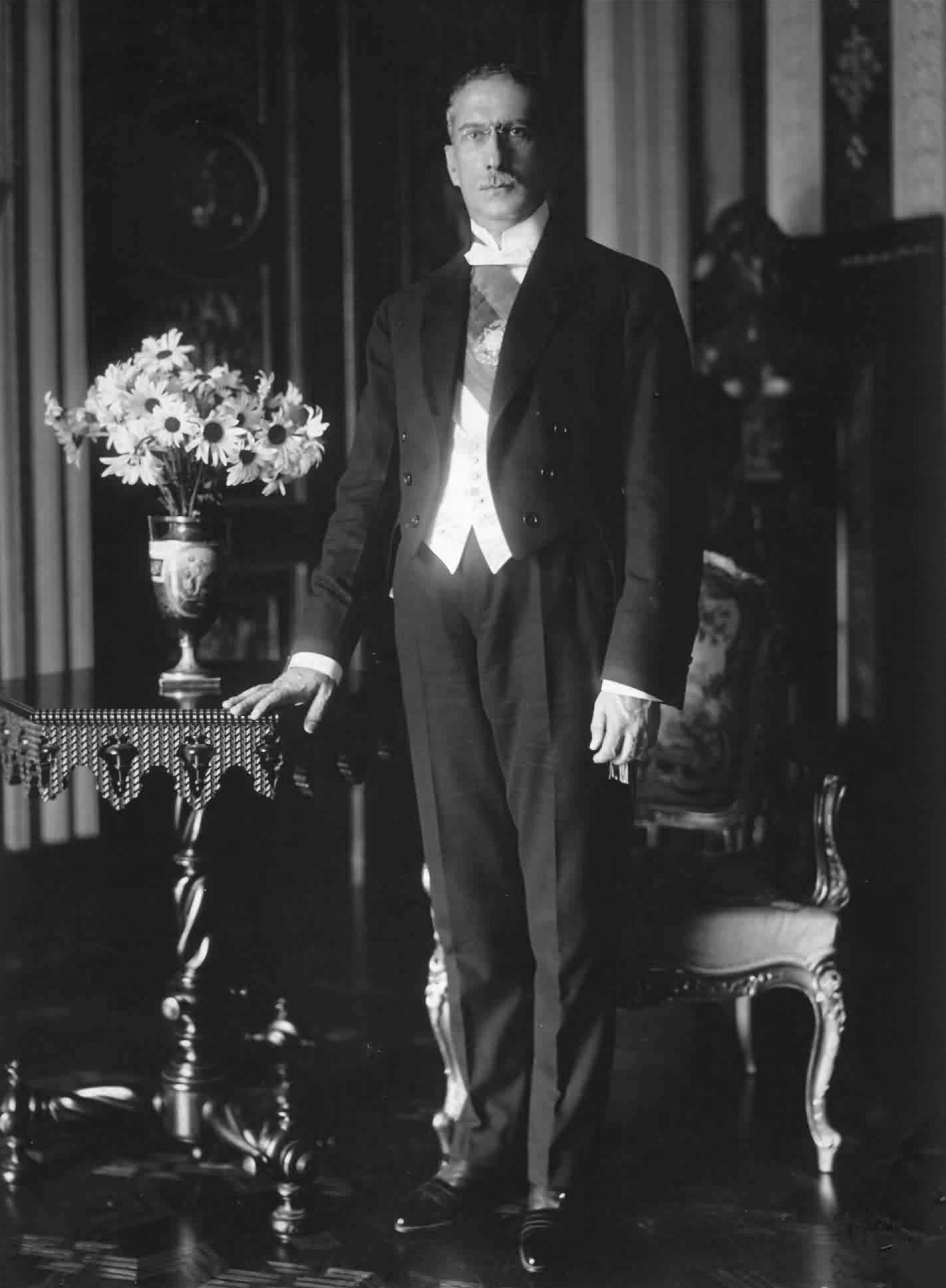
Bernardes with the presidential sash

Personally, Bernardes has been described as a disciplined, diligent, intelligent and well-informed man, punctual, "well spoken, cultured and with polite gestures". Of a "private life above suspicion", "austere habits, a stern appearance, always serious", he "rarely smiled". "No one has ever seen him have an outburst of anger". Apparently shy, Bernardes expressed himself well, although he preferred to listen rather than speak in front of ministers. In public, he always wore "impeccably tailored pants". He wrote correctly, with "sobriety" and "elegance". Nair de Teffé, wife of Hermes da Fonseca, described him as a "dry, austere, formal man", "affable in a mild manner". Afonso Arinos described him as "invariably courteous, extremely reserved, always well dressed and used to remain motionless at his bench, so intent on reading the daily appointments that it seemed like he was learning them by heart".

When president, Bernardes did not appear in public and only showed himself in closed spaces or to previously selected audiences, which can be explained by the angry mobs that welcomed him at the beginning of the campaign in Rio de Janeiro. O Globo praised Washington Luís for opening Catete to popular audiences, "reestablishing practices that the misanthropic tendency of his predecessor had abolished". Even in his private office, in the morning, Bernardes wore a double-breasted jacket. In the afternoons, he could be seen praying on Catete's terrace, although, according to him, in 1925 he was no longer a practicing Catholic and only later resumed the religion.

Still according to Afonso Arinos, Bernardes had "broad personal ambition", bringing "probably well-established in his spirit the certainty of his own ascension". He placed a lot of trust in himself due to "an almost religious faith in the republican mission that had been assigned to him by God or destiny". Conversely, "he distrusted his adversaries for moral reasons, always attributing to them cavilous intentions. He also distrusted his friends, but because he believed them to be naive, inexperienced, unaware of universal malice". Bernardes already said that "it is essential to have a lot of malice towards politicians in this environment and to always distrust them, no matter how much they deserve it from us". In the view of Pandiá Calógeras, one of Epitácio Pessoa's ministers, Bernardes "considered any dissent from his own opinions as proof of personal enmity".

According to historian Norma de Goés Monteiro, Bernardes "was not a man to forgive. He "had a reputation as a hardened political fighter: he remembered his friends and never forgot his enemies", according to Eul-Soo Pang. He always dealt with his enemies with iron and fire". His predominant characterization in historiography is that of a revanchist and vengeful ruler, with an opinionated and willful character. According to Afonso Arinos, Bernardes carried out the "methodical destruction of all his enemies and former adversaries", less "out of feelings of revenge or in the interest of his security, than out of a spirit of public morality and the duty to maintain order in the country". (Note: "As he had a mystical belief of being the agent of a superhuman mission, such presumed enemies were considered by him as enemies of the country and common good" (Pandiá Calógeras, cited in Cascardo 2005, p. 248).) Afrânio de Carvalho, a biographer of Raul Soares, assessed that Bernardes behaved like "a resentful person who, having defeated his opponents, did not defeat himself".

The president "filled the four-year period 1922–1926 with his harsh and indomitable individuality", in Assis Chateaubriand's terms. According to Pedro Calmon, psychologists saw him as a "strong man", "inflexible in his directives". According to Gilberto Amado's testimony, "Bernardes liked power to actually exercise it" and "he commanded, he was never ordered". "The hypothesis of Bernardes abandoning power could not be conceived". According to other descriptions, he was "harsh, hard and uncompromising", but also "honorable and incorruptible"; "honest and with high public spirit", but "too rigid and reserved". "[A] man of action", "[he] would go to the end". "He did not know how to be generous, or even tolerant towards his adversaries", but all out of a sincere "conviction of fulfilling a higher mission", according to Calógeras.

=== Reputation ===
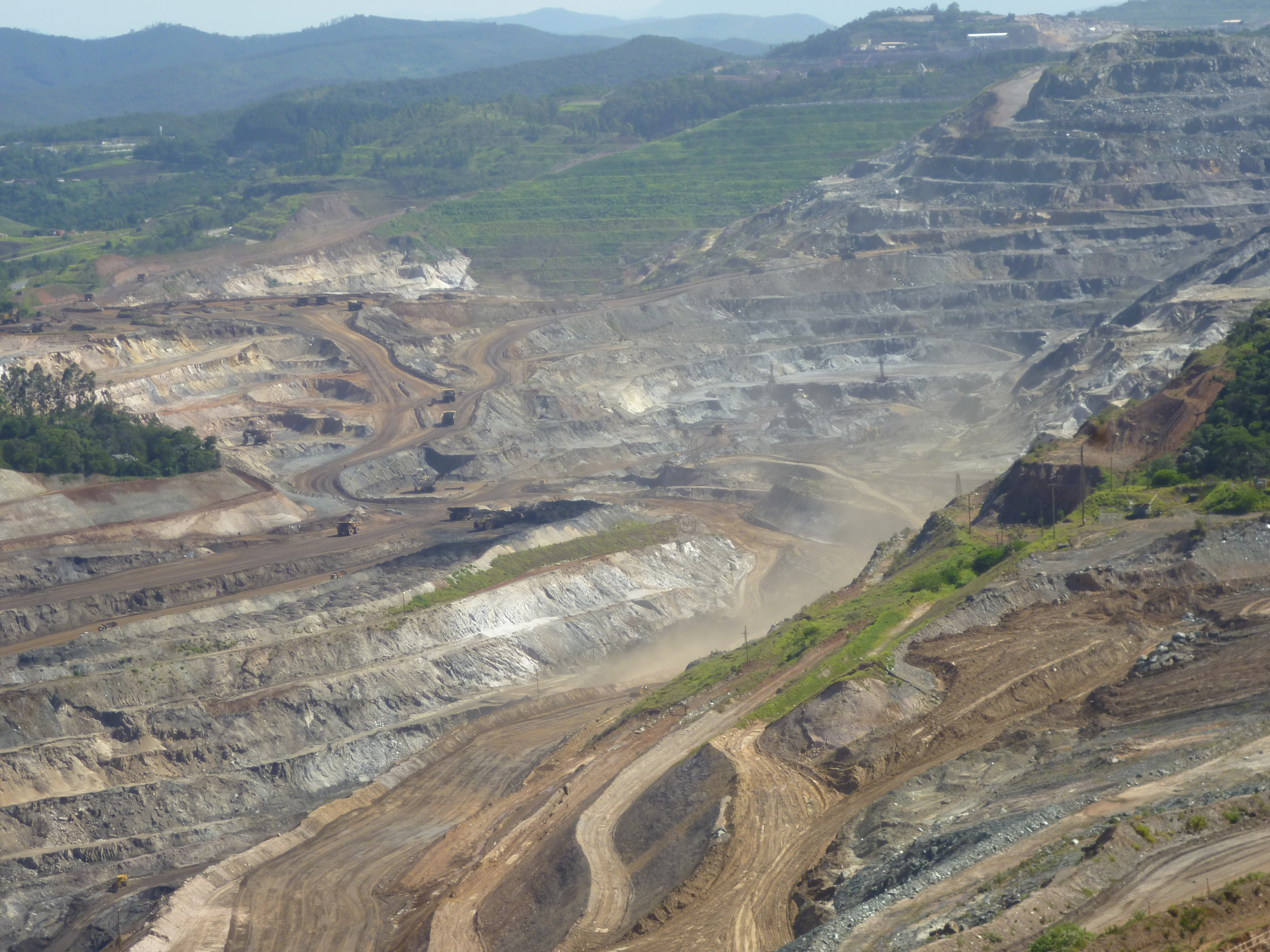
Iron mining in Itabira, basis of the nationalist image of Bernardism

Bernardes was one of the most controversial rulers of his period. Charismatic, but not popular, he was idolized by his friends and hated by his enemies. He is remembered for having ruled through violent authoritarianism, but also a "modernizing authoritarianism". His opponents coined nicknames such as "Viçosa's reprobate", "Seu Mé", "rolinha", "Calamitoso" and "[state of] emergency president". The Estado Novo, by disqualifying the "Old Republic", of which Bernardes was a representative, cemented the negative memory around him. In historiography he is seen as xenophobic and intransigent. More favorable writers prefer to justify Bernardes' repressive measures as a reaction to the opposition's attitudes. Favorable biographies describe him as statesman and "State builder", who implemented policies of public interest, without ever tolerating administrative immorality.

Pandiá Calógeras saw a tragedy in Bernardes' presidency: "the president sincerely yearned to present himself in the eyes of the nation as an angel defending the purity of republican doctrine and the principle of authority". But what the "governed mass" could see was "a kind of low police dictatorship, in the hands of unaccountable subordinates, of the lowest class and the least respectable". Calógeras exempted Bernardes from blame for "his most censored decisions": he was "the victim of exploiters of his known weaknesses".

The flagrant failure to fulfill one of his campaign promises was highly criticized: "the president will forget the insults done to the candidate". (Note: Interview with Jornal do Comércio published on 19 March 1922 (Silva 2004, p. 55).) Hélio Silva remarked that the opposition press disregarded this promise, and Bruno de Almeida Magalhães argued that the opposition canceled the promise at the time it threatened governability. For Francisco Moacir de Assunção Filho, Bernardes' role "was not exactly that of a statesman", but "possibly no other president of the so-called Old Republic faced so many adversities during his term in office". Years later, a self-criticism by Bernardes, when he was a federal deputy, was published in Ultima Hora on 17 November 1967: "as president of the Republic, I was just a police chief. And as a police chief faced with revolutionary pressure, I only knew how to do one thing: to arrest, persecute, contain by terror".

Another aspect of his reputation was the "fight to defend natural resources" against foreign capital, in the cases of iron, oil and the Amazon Hyleia. As a protectionist and opponent of the Itabira Iron Ore Company, he was accused of being an enemy of the steel industry. His economic nationalism was not always recognized by his contemporaries. Due to the proposals of the Montagu Mission, Bernardes was accused of being a puppet of foreign interests in 1924.

=== São Paulo and Clevelândia ===
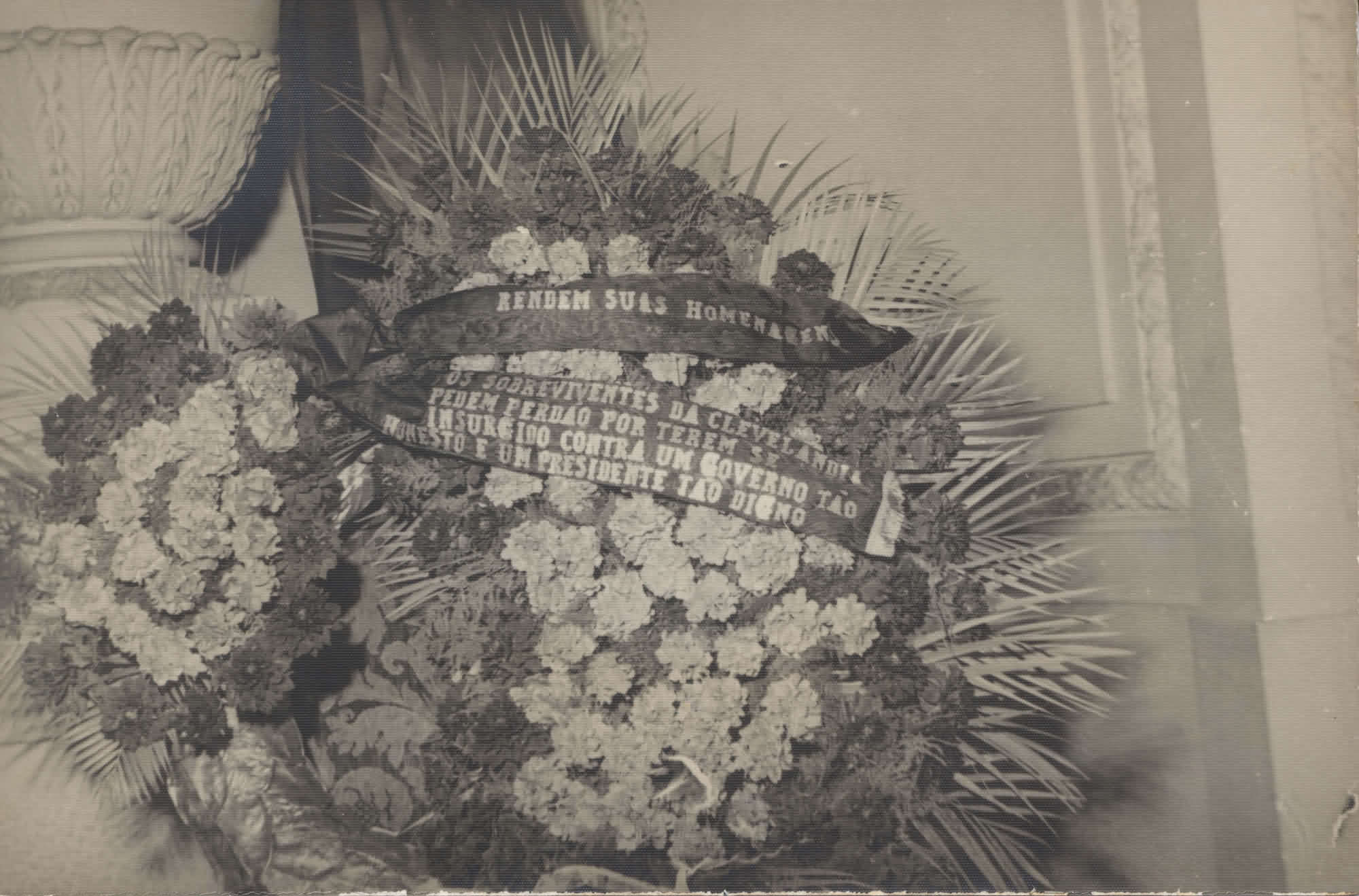
Tribute from the "survivors of Clevelândia" at Bernardes' wake in 1955

The authorized biography Arthur Bernardes: Estadista da República, by Bruno de Almeida Magalhães, barely covers the bombing, repression and other sensitive topics to the former president's image. The chapter referring to the state of emergency, Clevelândia and the constitutional reform is entitled "Bastion of legality". Magalhães remarked the exceptional measures taken in previous governments, arguing that Floriano Peixoto, with his firing squads and deportations to the Amazon, did much worse. In the same chapter, he compared Bernardes to Peixoto, praising both for saving the Republic by crushing revolutionary waves. The "iron will" of Pessoa and Bernardes supposedly spared the nation from a fratricidal struggle.

In São Paulo, the president is partly remembered as the destroyer of the city. The use of artillery, as it harmed civilians more than the rebel positions, was branded as a "terrifying bombing". Jurists discussed the decision to bomb São Paulo as a possible war crime for which Bernardes would be the highest responsible authority. Bernardes avoided the subject in public. In private, he would have argued that the bombing was to prevent an American occupation of the Amazon, under the pretext of the weakness of the Brazilian government. This explanation fits with his nationalist rhetoric, but it is not very credible considering the non-interventionism of the then president of the United States, Calvin Coolidge.

The armed revolt of 1924 ended up falling into official oblivion in São Paulo. Clevelândia also fell into oblivion for many years, although it sometimes appeared in the press under "the central thesis of an open-air extermination camp". Magalhães ignored the case: "some prisoners perished", but "the legend about Clevelândia" has already been "inquestionably refuted". The specialized bibliography proves a high mortality rate in the area.

=== Bernardism ===
Statue of Artur Bernardes and the Arthur Bernardes House in the background, in Viçosa

The political current aligned with Bernardes' leadership, his style and his time in power are called Bernardism, whose symbol was a red carnation worn in the lapel. As an admirer of Floriano Peixoto, Bernardes was even cited as a Jacobin, an ideological label that could mean radicalism, nationalism and/or authoritarianism in this historical period. Bernardes' actions in the Minas Gerais and federal governments demonstrate his sympathy for the general lines of the Brazilian Jacobin program: the protection of industry, nationalization of soil, exclusion of foreigners from politics, aid to small properties and tariff reforms. However, he differed greatly in proposing collaboration between Church and State. Political scientist Christian Lynch classified Bernardes as a conservative republican along the lines of Pinheiro Machado, Quintino Bocaiúva, Campos Sales and other eminent politicians of the period.

Bernardes, Raul Soares and Nelson Coelho de Sena were exponents of what Fabíula Sevilha de Souza defined as a Minas Gerais-style developmentalist project initiated during the administration of João Pinheiro (1906–1908). Pinheiro defended protectionism at an early stage in the industry, to boost private initiative, which would start with the raw materials available in the territory and evolve into more complex industries. Education, including popular and technical-agricultural education, would train a disciplined and moral workforce, with a love for work and property, alleviating the social instability of modernization. ESAV can be considered an heir to João Pinheiro's model farms.

Pinheiro and the Bernardes-Soares-Sena trio diverge in liberalism, from which the latter moved away, in a more national-authoritarian intellectual environment. In the figure of Bernardes "the cult, respect, [and] the personalization of authority, completed each other, expanding with authoritarianism, under whose sign the world began to live". Authoritarianism would be the response to the degeneration and deviation from Order and Progress demonstrated by social upheavals. Brazilian laws, said Bernardes, were drawn up under an "enthusiastic and generous idealism, by men who had no experience or practical knowledge of the new form of government", which would have transformed the Brazilian Republic into a "system of exceptional freedoms", "excessively progressive and little suited to our country, our nature, our social and political culture". The 1891 Constitution "disarmed the government to conveniently defend order". Bernardes even agreed with the tenentists that elections in the Old Republic were a "scam" and the government was full of corrupt people.

Christian Lynch saw in him and in Washington Luís an autocratic presidency, different from his predecessors, who were arbiters or sentinels of the system. Hélio Silva defended Bernardes against the accusation of being a dictator, but acknowledged that he was an authoritarian president. For Afonso Arinos, "if Bernardes' government in Minas Gerais was, as they say, dictatorial, there is no doubt that it was a kind of 'enlightened dictatorship'".

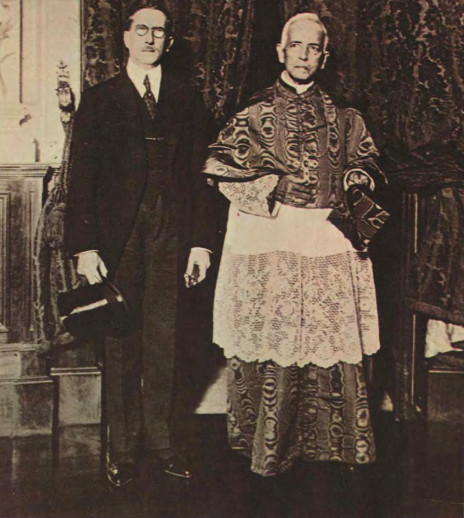
Bernardes, as president, confirms the rapprochement between Church and State with Cardinal Arcoverde

Bernardes' ambition for development was elitist and would keep the agrarian elites, now associated with the industrial elites, in power. A conservative modernization would place the lower classes under state guardianship. When declaring a national holiday on 1 May, Worker's Day, Bernardes clarified that the date was not intended for "subversive projects", but for the "glorification of orderly and useful labor".

The Executive would be strong, and the State would be voluntarist and dirigist; in his words to the press, when he founded PR, "the State cannot be a simple spectator", "it must intervene to police, regulate, maintain balance, repress abuses and injustices, as the supreme organ of security and social harmony". On the other hand, in the Constituent Assembly he criticized state interventionism and proposed the extinction of the government entities created during the governments of Getúlio Vargas.

The system's political strength, Bernardes recognized, began in the municipalities. As a municipalist, he defended municipal autonomy and administrative decentralization, although he also sought greater external control over municipal budgets. In his platform as a candidate for state president, he defended state support for factions that better took care of the "impartial and severe collection of taxes" and "honest and scrupulous application of public money", demanding from them "a stamp of greater nobility and elevation in local politics".

His messages to the National Congress argued in favor of compulsory and secret voting, the development of railways and colonization of marginal lands, reformulation of income tax, restriction of firearms to the military and police personnel, tightening of the naturalization criteria for foreigners and applicability of the death penalty during internal revolts. Bernardes also proposed the transfer of Brazil's capital away from the "tumult of a great cosmopolitan city", combining the promise of development in the countryside with the fear of the masses of Rio de Janeiro. In the 1946 Constituent Assembly, he was against the election of the mayor of the Federal District and defended a six-year term for the President of Brazil.

== Legacy ==
Arthur Bernardes Building, the main building at the Federal University of Viçosa, in 2026

According to historian Carlo Romani, the legacy of the Bernardes government was "the beginning of preventative and systematic social control, on the part of the federal government", whose "repressive apparatus and, more than that, the mentality in the lower echelons of the bureaucracy of surveillance and control over life remained latent" in the dictatorships of 1937–1945 and 1964–1985. The example of the 4th Auxiliary Police Bureau, which arrested Bernardes himself in 1932, was soon followed by the creation of DOPS (Department of Political and Social Order) in the states. Repression during the state of emergency coincides with the beginning of decline of the anarchists and the rise of the Communist Party in the Brazilian labor movement. Both were repressed, but the communists less so, becoming predominant in Rio de Janeiro.

In Viçosa, the ESAV did not prevent the coffee growing crisis in Zona da Mata, but became a national reference nevertheless, cultivating an agricultural intellectual elite in public administration, the private sector and academia. The biographical summary of Bernardes published by the Federal University of Viçosa has a positive tone, and the Artur Bernardes House, located in Silviano Brandão Square, in Viçosa, was listed in 1995 by the State Institute of Historical and Artistic Heritage (Iepha) of Minas Gerais. Built during his presidential term, the house was visited sporadically by him and today contains a memorial.

The Bernardes administration's labor legislation pointed to official unionism, a model later implemented in the Vargas Era. Companhia Vale do Rio Doce S.A., founded in 1942 to manage, among others, the Itabira mines, followed a model similar to that proposed by Bernardes. However, the first large state-owned steel company in Brazil, Companhia Siderúrgica Nacional, was installed in Rio de Janeiro and not in Minas Gerais.

Bernardes lends his name to a municipality in Minas Gerais, formerly Calambau, and another in São Paulo, formerly Guarucaia. He also lends his name to an oil refinery in Cubatão.

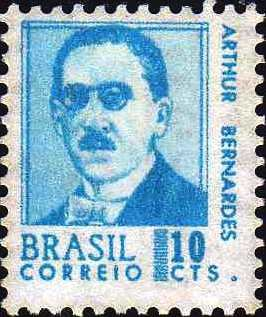
Artur Bernardes on a 1967 stamp

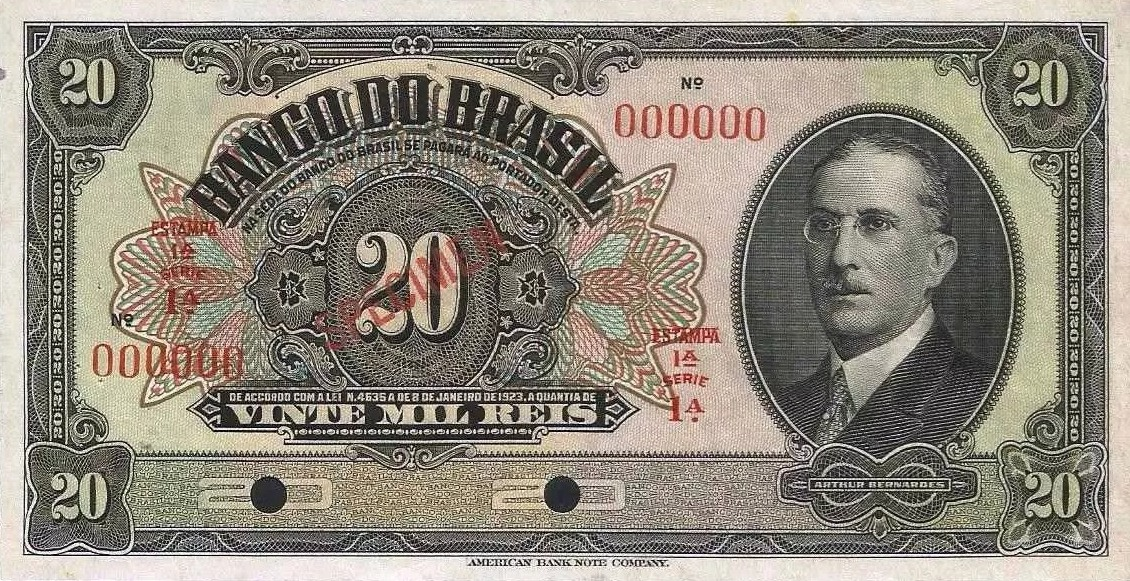
Artur Bernardes on a 20,000 réis bill (1923)

== Honours ==
=== Foreign Honours ===
- Grand Officer of the Order of Christ, Portugal (17 May 1958)

== Notes ==
Political offices
Preceded by Delfim Moreira	Governor of Minas Gerais; 1918–1922	Succeeded by Raul Soares de Moura
Preceded by Epitácio Pessoa	President of Brazil; 1922–1926	Succeeded by Washington Luís
