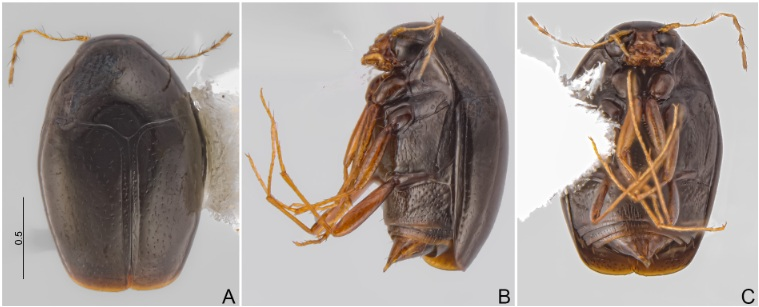

Scientific classification
- Kingdom: Animalia
- Phylum: Arthropoda
- Clade: Pancrustacea
- Class: Insecta
- Order: Coleoptera
- Suborder: Polyphaga
- Infraorder: Staphyliniformia
- Family: Staphylinidae
- Genus: Scaphisoma
- Species: S. peculiare

Binomial name
- Scaphisoma peculiare von Groll, 2025

= Scaphisoma peculiare =

Species of beetle

Scaphisoma peculiare is a species of beetle in the family Staphylinidae. This species is found in south-eastern Brazil (Minas Gerais). Adults reach a length of about 1.46–1.70 mm and have a brown body and yellow appendages. Adults have been collected from undetermined resupinate and/or crust fungi.

== Taxonomy ==
Scaphisoma peculiare was formally described in 2025 based on a male specimen collected from the campus of the Federal University of Viçosa in Minas Gerais. According to the scientists who named the species, the specific epithet is a Latin word meaning "singular", referring to the different characteristics of the species.

The species is similar to S. repandum.

== Description ==
The beetle is 1.46–1.70 mm long and has a brown, oval-shaped body. The antennae, legs, mouthparts, apex of the elytra, and the posterior bead of the abdominal ventrites and tergites are yellow in color.

The last maxillary palpomere is modified and flattened towards the tip. The sutural striae are present and are connected to the basal striae. The mesocoxal lines are slightly arcuate and the submesocoxal area is very short. The metacoxal lines are parallel to the metacoxae and the submetacoxal area is also very short. Abdominal ventrite I has coarse and dense punctures. Males lack tenent setae. In the aedeagus, the median lobe, parameres, and the sclerite of the internal sac is elongate and curved in the frontal view. The tip of the parameres is irregularly denticulate. In females, the distal gonocoxite is fusiform.

The species has only been collected from the Viçosa campus of the University of Viçosa in the state of Minas Gerais in southeastern Brazil. Adults have been collected from unidentified crust and resupinate fungi.
