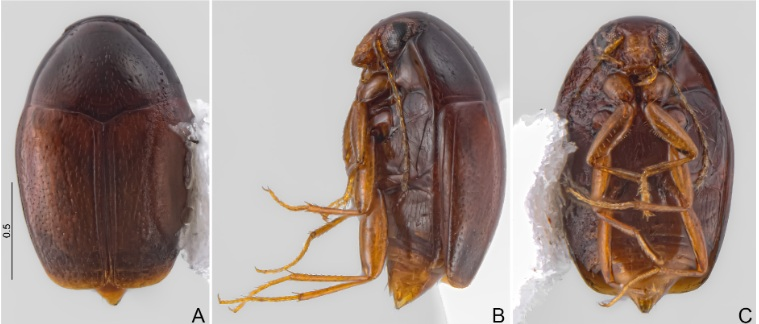

Scientific classification
- Kingdom: Animalia
- Phylum: Arthropoda
- Clade: Pancrustacea
- Class: Insecta
- Order: Coleoptera
- Suborder: Polyphaga
- Infraorder: Staphyliniformia
- Family: Staphylinidae
- Genus: Scaphisoma
- Species: S. mutabile

Binomial name
- Scaphisoma mutabile von Groll, 2025

= Scaphisoma mutabile =

Species of beetle

Scaphisoma mutabile is a species of beetle of the family Staphylinidae. This species is found in south-eastern Brazil (Minas Gerais). Adults reach a length of about 1.28–1.52 mm and have a brown-reddish body. The pronotum is darker than the elytra. Adults have been collected from Xylodon flaviporus and an undetermined crust/resupinate fungus.

== Taxonomy ==
Scaphisoma mutabile was formally described in 2025 based on a male specimen collected from the campus of the Federal University of Viçosa in Minas Gerais. According to the scientists who named the species, the specific epithet is a Greek word meaning "change", referring to the beetle changing color in different positions.

The species is similar to S. iridescens.

== Description ==
The beetle is 1.28–1.52 mm long and is brown-reddish in color. The pronotum is darker than the elytra, with both being iridescent, especially in strong light. The mouthparts, antennae, legs, apex of the elytra, and the abdominal segments III–VII are yellow. The iridescence is variable, with some individuals have iridescent ventrites as well.

The elytra, thorax, legs, and abdomen have a distinct strigulate microsculpture. The sutural striae are parallel to the suture, while the basal striae are absent. The submesocoxal lines are nearly parallel and punctate. The submetacoxal lines are arcuate. In the aedeagus, the parameres are widened towards the tip and the internal sac has a simple sclerite. Females have large and twisted spermatheca, as well as curved distal gonocoxites.

The species has only been collected from the Viçosa campus of the University of Viçosa in the state of Minas Gerais in southeastern Brazil. Adults have been collected from Xylodon flaviporus and unidentified crust and resupinate fungi.
