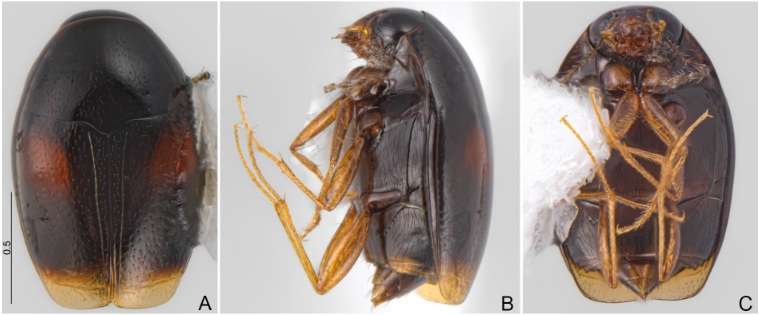

Scientific classification
- Kingdom: Animalia
- Phylum: Arthropoda
- Clade: Pancrustacea
- Class: Insecta
- Order: Coleoptera
- Suborder: Polyphaga
- Infraorder: Staphyliniformia
- Family: Staphylinidae
- Genus: Scaphisoma
- Species: S. hilarum

Binomial name
- Scaphisoma hilarum von Groll, 2025

= Scaphisoma hilarum =

Species of beetle

Scaphisoma hilarum is a species of beetle in the family Staphylinidae. This species is found in south-eastern Brazil (Minas Gerais). Adults reach a length of about 1.25–1.41 mm and have a blackish body. Each elytron with a large dark ochreous macula and a yellow area near the apex. Adults have been collected from Inonotus fungi.

== Taxonomy ==
Scaphisoma hilarum was formally described in 2025 based on a male specimen collected from the campus of the Federal University of Viçosa in Minas Gerais. According to the scientists who named the species, the specific epithet is a Latin word meaning "cheerful" or "merry", referring to the beetle's merry coloration.

The species is similar in size and aedeagus shape to S. jacobsoni and belongs to the S. haemorrhoidale group. It is also similar to S. jacqi.

== Description ==
The beetle is 1.25–1.41 mm long and is blackish in color. Each elytron has a large dark ochreous macula and a yellow area near the apex. The head, thoracic ventrites, and abdominal ventrite I are dark ochreous-brown, while the legs, mouthparts, and apex of the abdominal ventrites II–VII are light ochreous. Some individuals show a generally paler coloration or lack the macula on the elytra.

The basal striae are absent and the adsutural area is notably widened and not angulate anteriorly. The clypeus, coxae, femora, metaventrite, and abdomen have a strigulate microsculpture. The aedeagus has a three-lobed tip and females have a thick distal gonocoxite.

The species has only been collected from the Viçosa campus of the University of Viçosa in the state of Minas Gerais in southeastern Brazil. Adults have been collected from Inonotus fungi.
