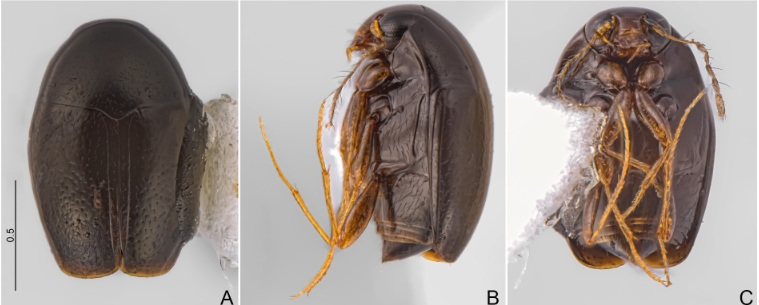

Scientific classification
- Kingdom: Animalia
- Phylum: Arthropoda
- Clade: Pancrustacea
- Class: Insecta
- Order: Coleoptera
- Suborder: Polyphaga
- Infraorder: Staphyliniformia
- Family: Staphylinidae
- Genus: Scaphisoma
- Species: S. infinitum

Binomial name
- Scaphisoma infinitum von Groll, 2025

= Scaphisoma infinitum =

Species of beetle

Scaphisoma infinitum is a species of beetle of the Staphylinidae family. This species is found in south-eastern Brazil (Minas Gerais). Adults reach a length of about 1.09–1.36 mm and have a dark brown body. Adults have been collected from undetermined resupinate and/or crust fungi. A few specimens where collected from a small decomposing log with Ceratiomyxa fruticulosa.

== Taxonomy ==
Scaphisoma infinitum was formally described in 2025 based on a male specimen collected from the campus of the Federal University of Viçosa in Minas Gerais. The specific epithet is a Latin word meaning "endless", due to the large number of specimens collected by the scientists naming the species. The species is similar to similar to S. minutipenis.

== Description ==
The beetle is 1.09–1.36 mm long and light to dark brown in color, with a strong shine and no microsculpture. The antennae, mouthparts, legs, tip of the elytra, and abdominal ventrites II–VI are yellow. Some individuals have a pronotum that is darker than the elytra.

Antennomere IX is elongate. The submesocoxal lines are slightly arcuate and punctate. The basal striae are absent, while the sutural striae are present and curved anteriorly. The aedeagus is distinctly small, with an elongate and triangular tip and a simple sclerite of the internal sac. Females have an elongate distal gonocoxite.

The species has only been collected from the Viçosa campus of the University of Viçosa in the state of Minas Gerais in southeastern Brazil. Adults have been collected from undetermined resupinate and crust fungi, with some found on a small decomposing log with Ceratiomyxa fruticulosa slime mold growing on it.
