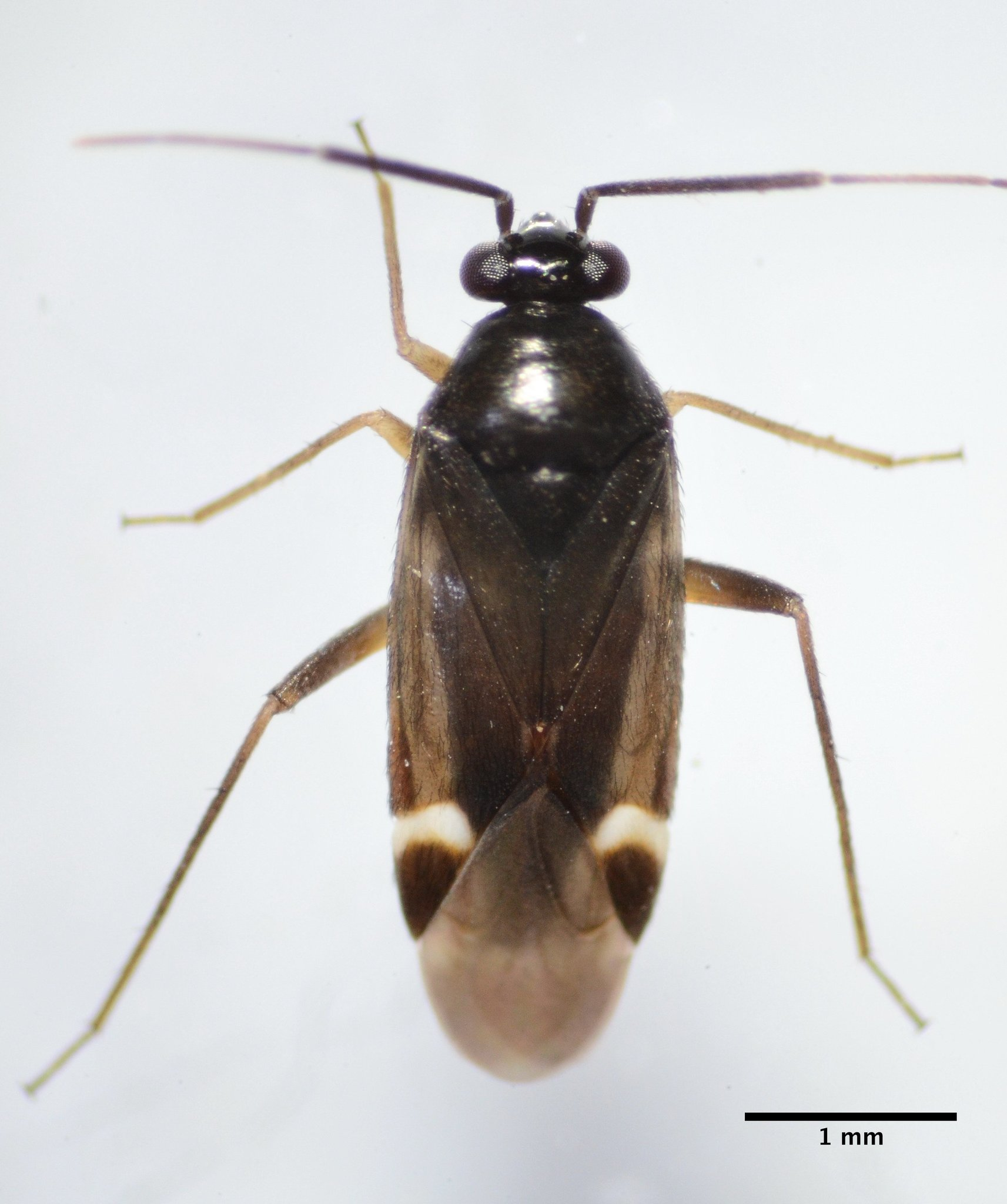

Scientific classification
- Kingdom: Animalia
- Phylum: Arthropoda
- Class: Insecta
- Order: Hemiptera
- Suborder: Heteroptera
- Family: Miridae
- Tribe: Leucophoropterini
- Genus: Tuxedo
- Species: T. flavicollis

Binomial name
- Tuxedo flavicollis (Knight, 1929)

Synonyms
- Microphylellus flavicollis Knight, 1929

= Tuxedo flavicollis =

Species of true bug

Tuxedo flavicollis is a species of plant bug in the family Miridae. It is found in North America.
