= Neaitkenia monteithi =

Scientific classification
- Kingdom: Animalia
- Phylum: Arthropoda
- Class: Insecta
- Order: Hemiptera
- Suborder: Heteroptera
- Family: Miridae
- Genus: Neaitkenia
- Species: N. monteithi

Binomial name
- Neaitkenia monteithi (Carvalho & Gross, 1982)

Species of true bug

Neaitkenia monteithi is a species of plant bug in the family Miridae.

It was first described in 1982 as Aitkenia monteithi by José Carvalho and Gordon Gross, but in 2011, Katrina Menard and Randall Schuh transferred it to the new genus, Neaitkenia to give its current name. This bug imitates an ant.

The species epithet honours the Australian entomologist Geoff Monteith.
