= UFV =

UFV may refer to:

- University of the Fraser Valley
- Universidade Federal de Viçosa
