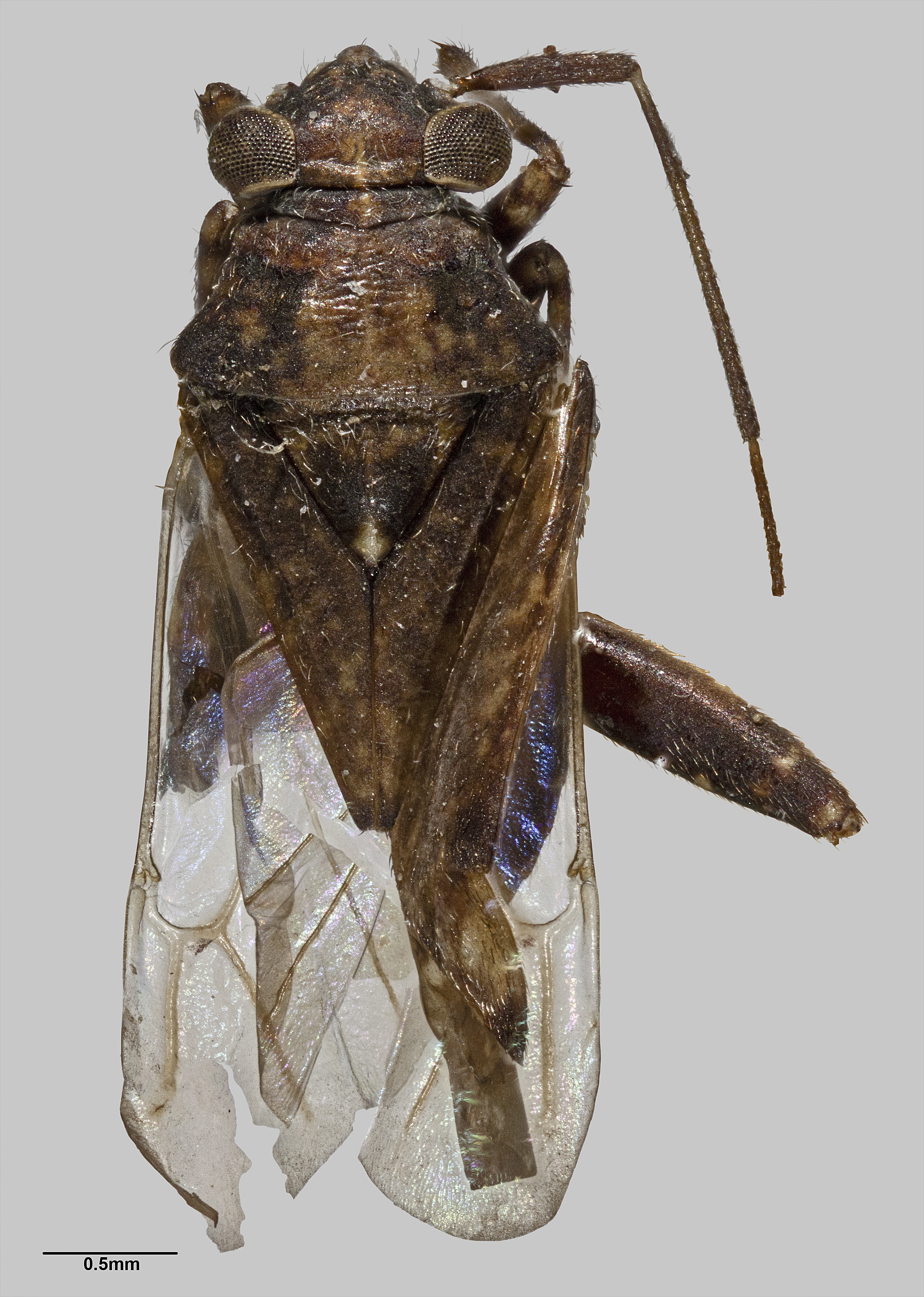
- Holotype of Chinamiris muehlenbeckiae

Scientific classification
- Kingdom: Animalia
- Phylum: Arthropoda
- Class: Insecta
- Order: Hemiptera
- Suborder: Heteroptera
- Family: Miridae
- Genus: Chinamiris
- Species: C. muehlenbeckiae

Binomial name
- Chinamiris muehlenbeckiae Woodward, 1950

= Chinamiris muehlenbeckiae =

Species of insect

Chinamiris muehlenbeckiae is a species of leaf bugs belonging to the order Hemiptera. The species is endemic to New Zealand, and was first described by Thomas E. Woodward in 1950. It primarily lives on the native New Zealand species Muehlenbeckia australis.

== Description ==
The species has a length of 4.4 mm (0.17 in) and is broadly oval. The head, pronotum, scutellum, and hemelytra are clothed with a mixture of short, fine, recumbent, dark hairs and pale, deciduous, scale-like hairs, except on the species' membrane . The species has a large and pale ostiolar peritreme. C. muehlenbeckiae is dark brown with black or brownish black mottlings.

It can be distinguished from other members of the genus by the horn-like projection on the left side of the species' pygophore, its wide tapering nronotal carina, oval form, small size and brown colour.

== Taxonomy ==
Woodward described the species in 1950 as the type species of the genus Chinamiris, which he described in the same paper. The genus was monotypic for over 40 years, in 1991 entomologists Alan C. Eyles and José Cândido de Melo Carvalho revised the genus, adding 30 species to the genus. The holotype was collected from Muehlenbeckia australis near Foxton in January 1950, and is held at the Auckland War Memorial Museum.

== Ecology ==
The species lives and feeds primarily on Muehlenbeckia australis and other Muehlenbeckia species, likely by feeding on sap. Adults are seen primarily between January and March, while nymphs are primarily seen in January. The species is likely able to fly.

== Distribution and habitat ==
The genus is endemic to New Zealand, known from the North Island between the Bay of Plenty and Wellington regions, and the upper South Island near Nelson. It is typically found in lowland montane areas in association with Muehlenbeckia
