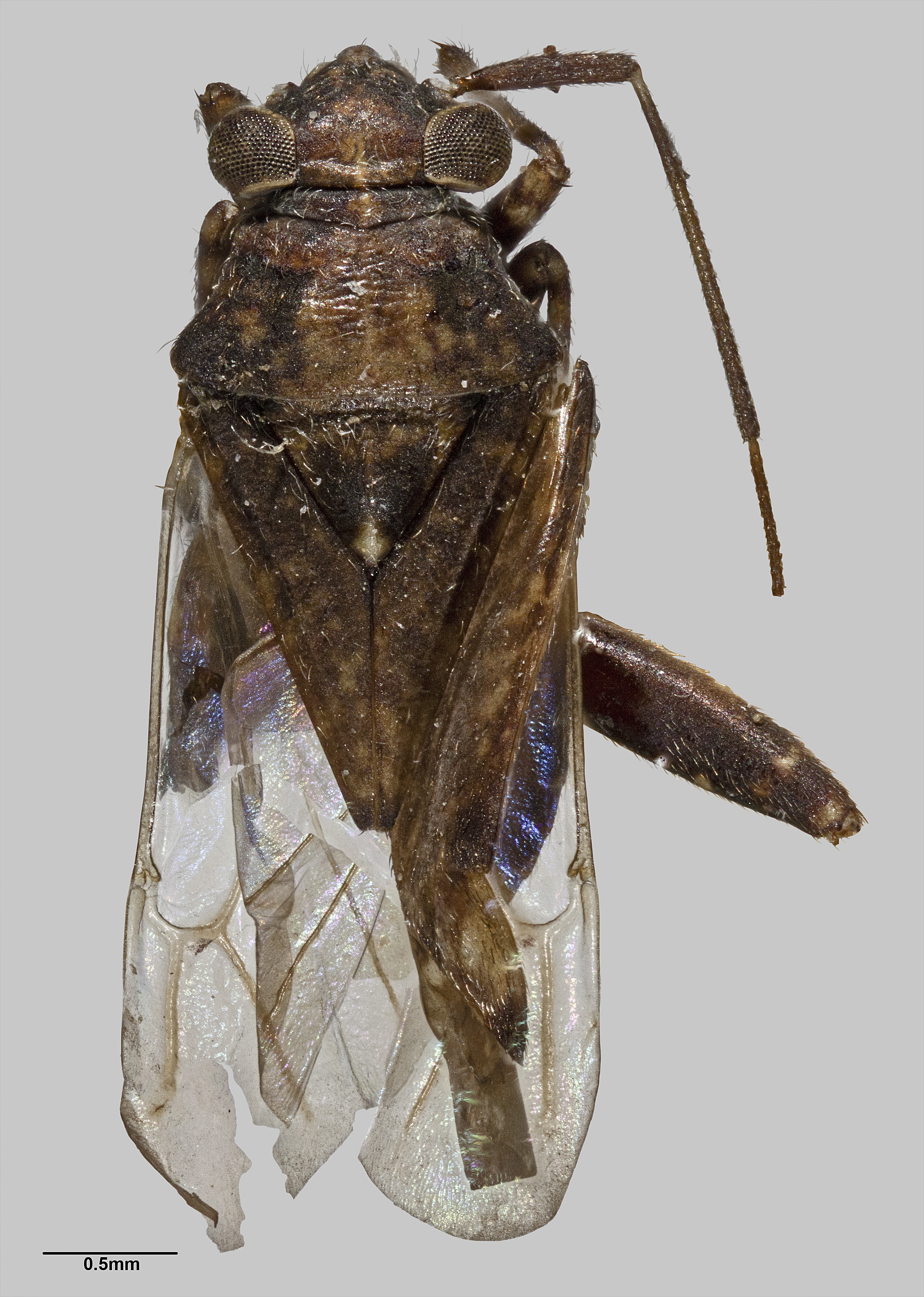
- Chinamiris muehlenbeckiae

Scientific classification
- Kingdom: Animalia
- Phylum: Arthropoda
- Class: Insecta
- Order: Hemiptera
- Suborder: Heteroptera
- Family: Miridae
- Tribe: Mirini
- Genus: Chinamiris; Woodward, 1950

Type species
- Chinamiris muehlenbeckiae Woodward, 1950

= Chinamiris =

Genus of insects

Chinamiris is a genus of leaf bugs belonging to the order Hemiptera. The genus is endemic to New Zealand, and was first described by Thomas E. Woodward in 1950.

== Description ==
Woodward described the genus as follows:

Body oval, dorsally with a covering of pale, deciduous pubescence. Head strongly declivous in front; eyes contiguous with and exserted beyond anterior margin of pronotum; vertex with complete transverse carina between eyes; antennae rather slender, with the first segment about as long as head and the second segment at least twice as long as first; rostrum reaching hind coxae, Pronotum shortly trapeziform, with prominent anterior collar; calli well developed; sides sinuate; base shallowly emarginate, exposing mesoscutum; disc without punctures but distinctly transversely rugose. Ostiolar peritreme large. Cuneus and membrane deflected, the latter mottled and with two cells, Posterior femora incrassated; tibiae with dark spines.

The genus can be distinguished from Pocciloscytus due to the form of the pronotum.

== Taxonomy ==
Woodward described the genus in 1950, naming C. muehlenbeckiae, which he described in the same paper, as the type species of the genus. A monotypic genus for over 40 years, in 1991 entomologists Alan C. Eyles and José Cândido de Melo Carvalho revised the genus, adding 29 new species and recombining C. laticinctus, originally described as Capsus laticinctus by Francis Walker in 1873.

Eyles and Carvalho place the genus in the tribe Mirini.

== Ecology ==
The species lives primarily on host plants native to New Zealand, including members of Carmichaelia, Coprosma, Olearia and Muehlenbeckia. Chinamiris fascinans has been found in association with mānuka bushes.

== Distribution ==
The genus is endemic to New Zealand, found on the main islands of New Zealand and the Chatham Islands.

== Species ==
The following species are recognised by GBIF:

- Chinamiris acutospinosus Eyles & Carvalho, 1991
- Chinamiris aurantiacus Eyles & Carvalho, 1991
- Chinamiris brachycerus Eyles & Carvalho, 1991
- Chinamiris citrinus Eyles & Carvalho, 1991
- Chinamiris cumberi Eyles & Carvalho, 1991
- Chinamiris daviesi Eyles & Carvalho, 1991
- Chinamiris dracophylloides Eyles & Carvalho, 1991
- Chinamiris elongatus Eyles & Carvalho, 1991
- Chinamiris fascinans Eyles & Carvalho, 1991
- Chinamiris guttatus Eyles & Carvalho, 1991
- Chinamiris hamus Eyles & Carvalho, 1991
- Chinamiris indeclivis Eyles & Carvalho, 1991
- Chinamiris juvans Eyles & Carvalho, 1991
- Chinamiris laticinctus (Walker, 1873)
- Chinamiris marmoratus Eyles & Carvalho, 1991
- Chinamiris minutus Eyles & Carvalho, 1991
- Chinamiris muehlenbeckiae Woodward, 1950
- Chinamiris niculatus Eyles & Carvalho, 1991
- Chinamiris nigrifrons Eyles & Carvalho, 1991
- Chinamiris opacus Eyles & Carvalho, 1991
- Chinamiris ovatus Eyles & Carvalho, 1991
- Chinamiris punctatus Eyles & Carvalho, 1991
- Chinamiris quadratus Eyles & Carvalho, 1991
- Chinamiris rufescens Eyles & Carvalho, 1991
- Chinamiris secundus Eyles & Carvalho, 1991
- Chinamiris testaceus Eyles & Carvalho, 1991
- Chinamiris unicolor Eyles & Carvalho, 1991
- Chinamiris virescens Eyles & Carvalho, 1991
- Chinamiris viridicans Eyles & Carvalho, 1991
- Chinamiris whakapapae Eyles & Carvalho, 1991
- Chinamiris zygotus Eyles & Carvalho, 1991

== Gallery ==
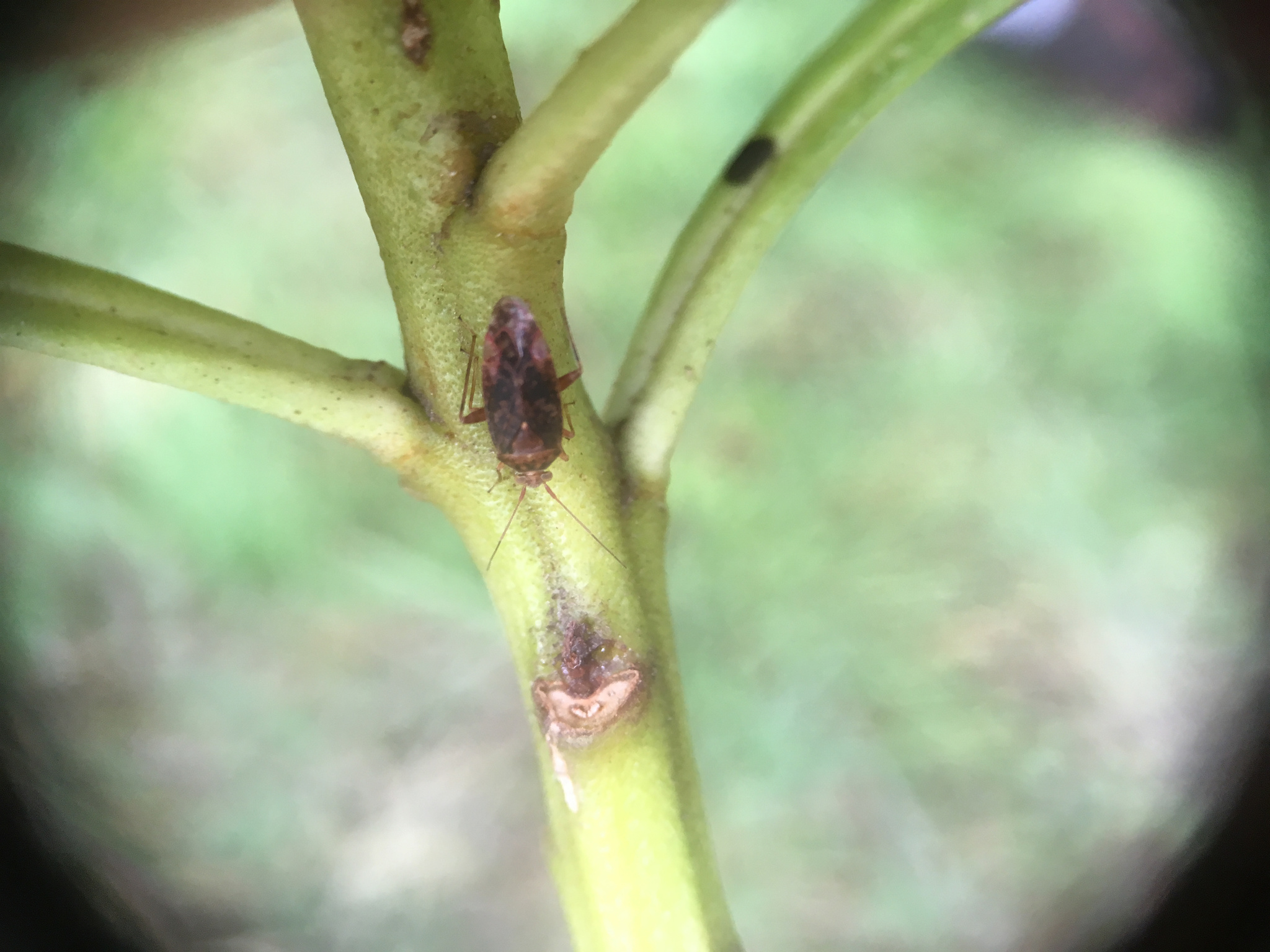
C. aurantiacus on the stem of Myoporum laetum

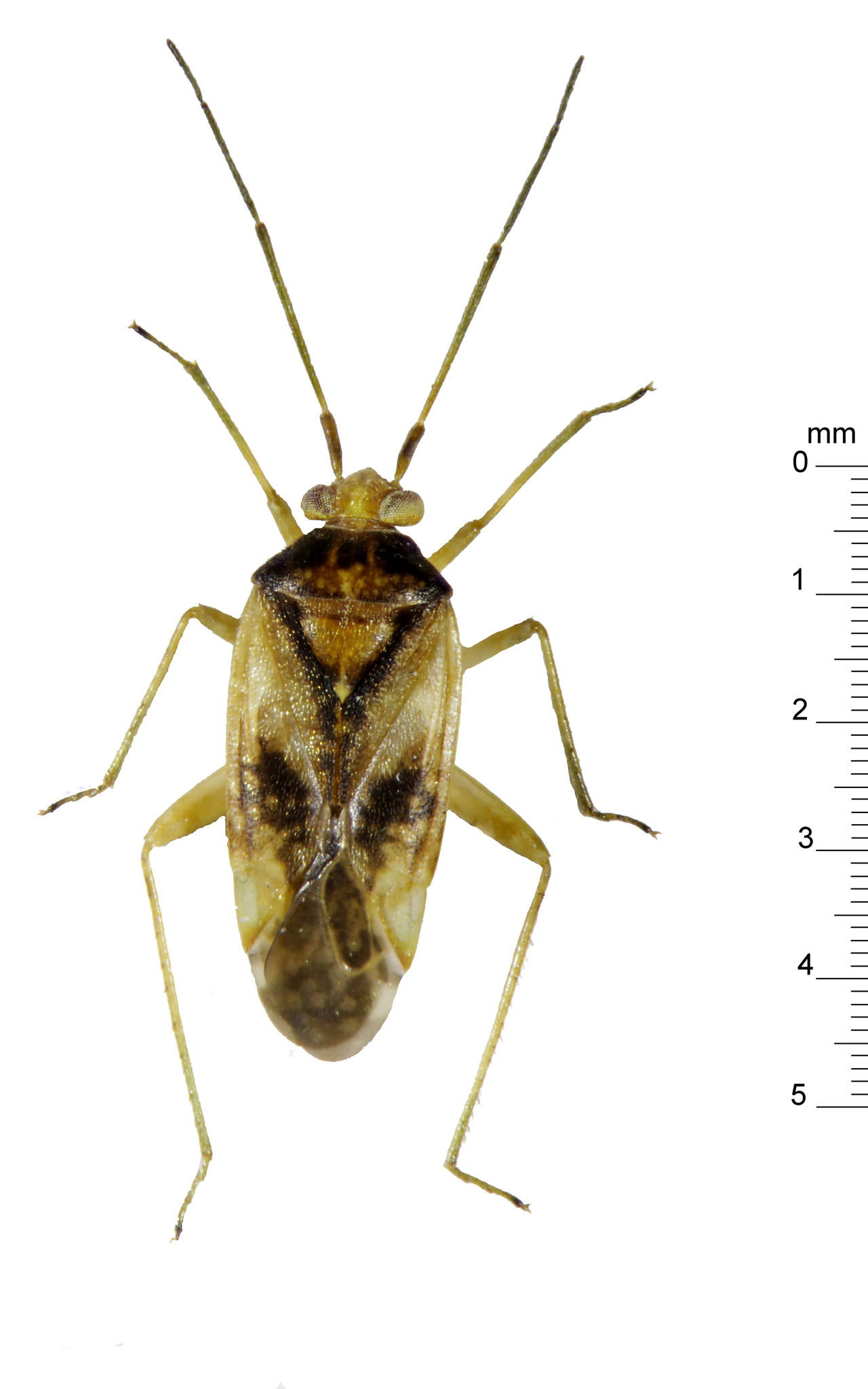
C. aurantiacus

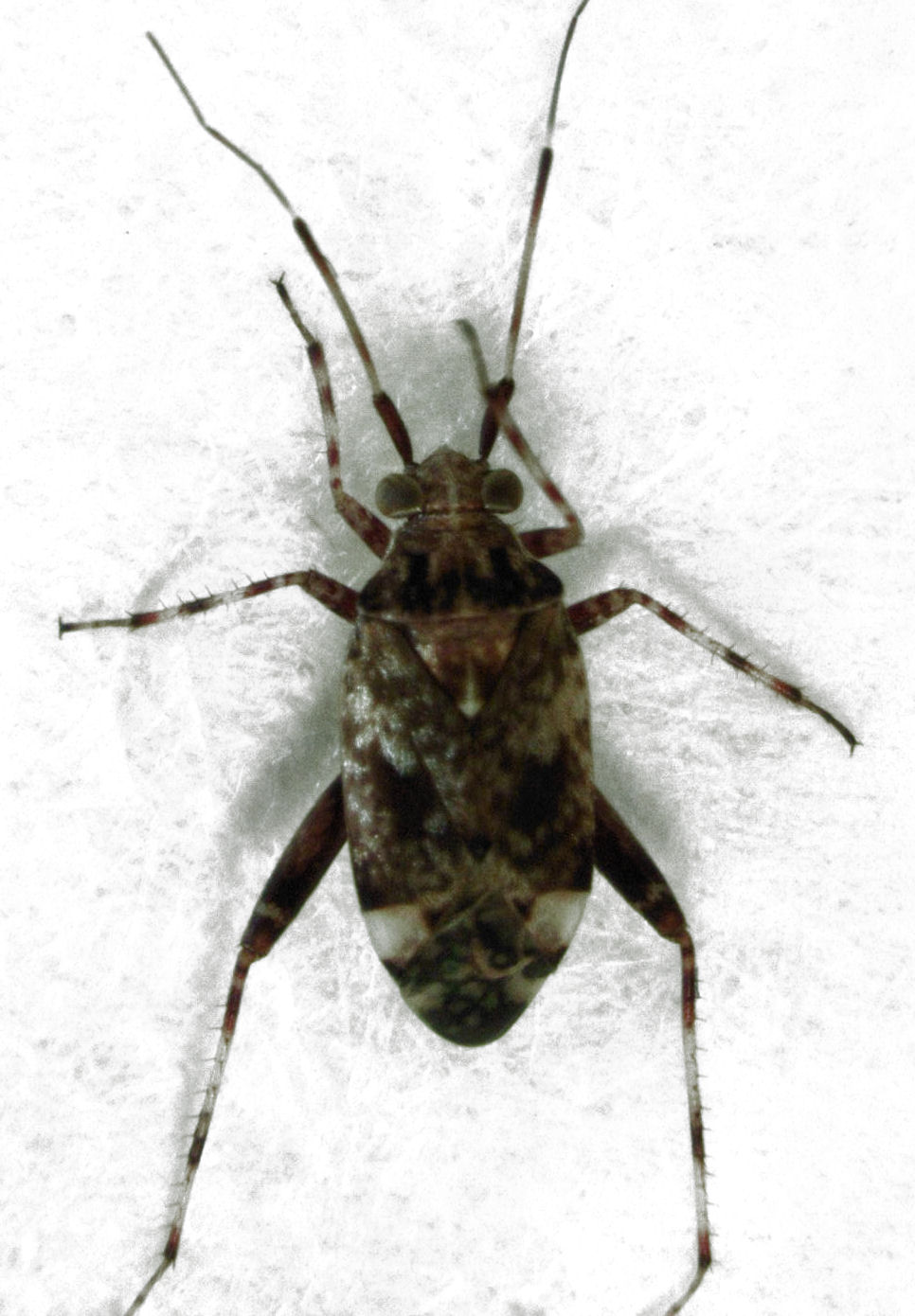
C. cumberi

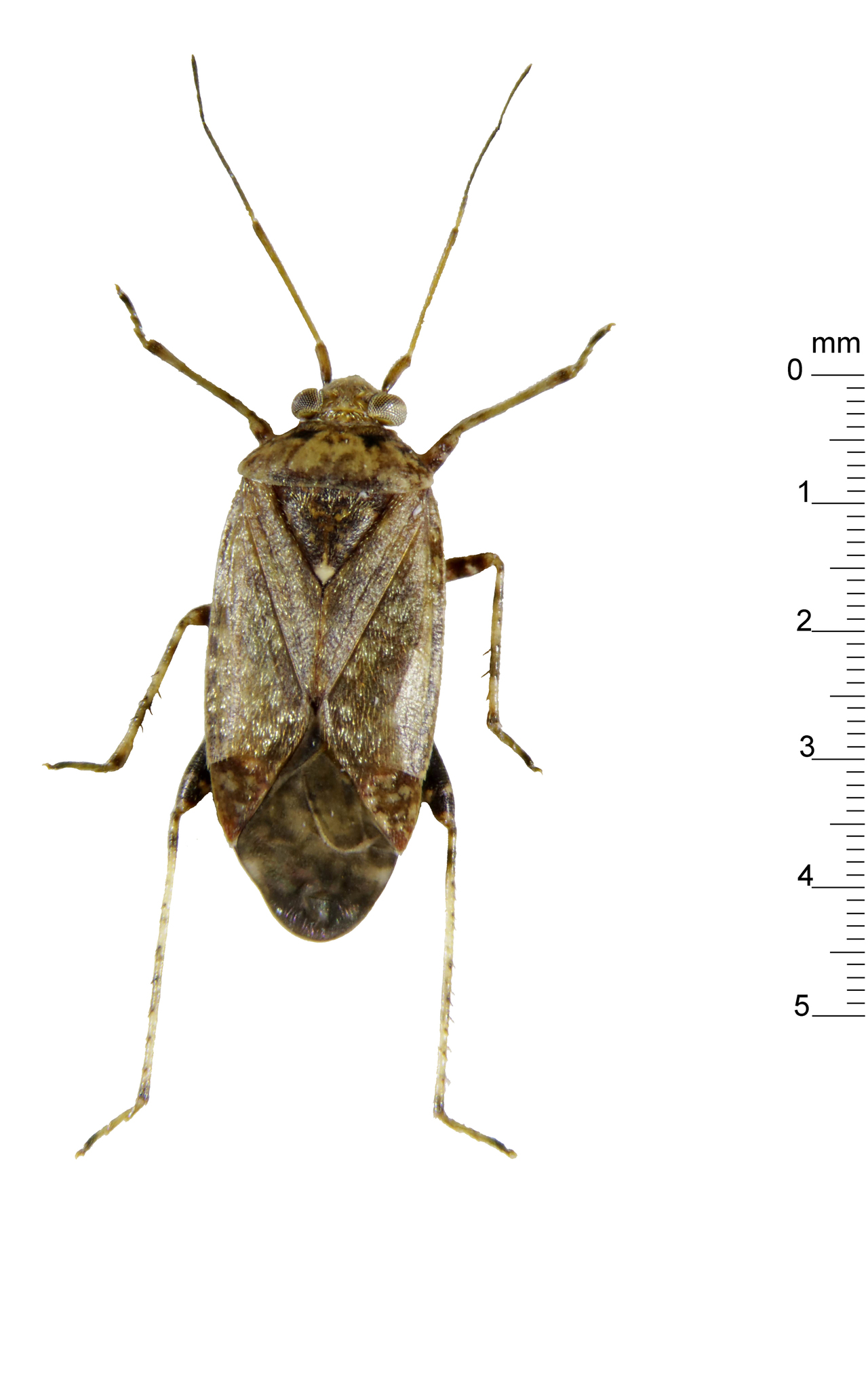
C. elongatus

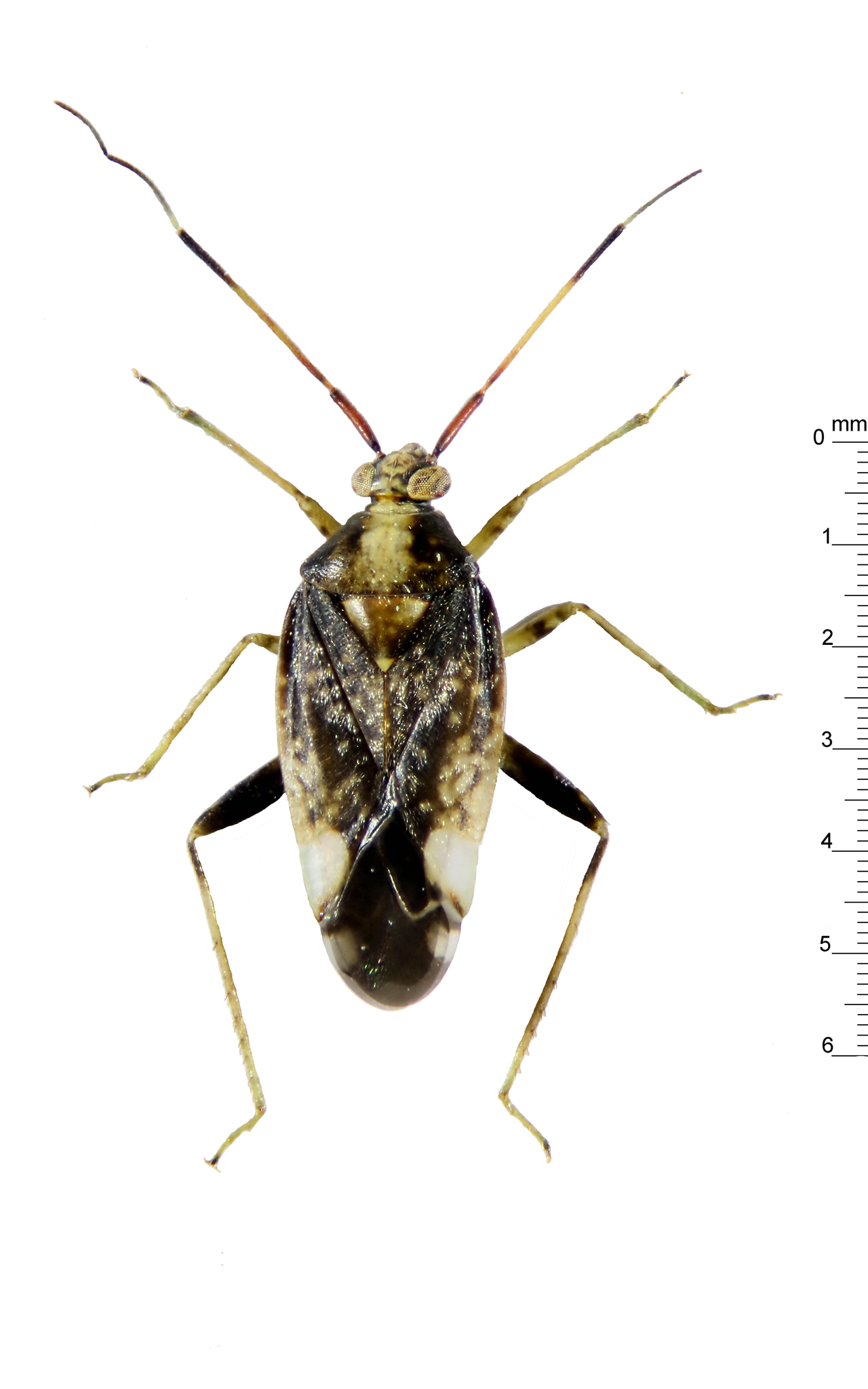
C. indeclivis

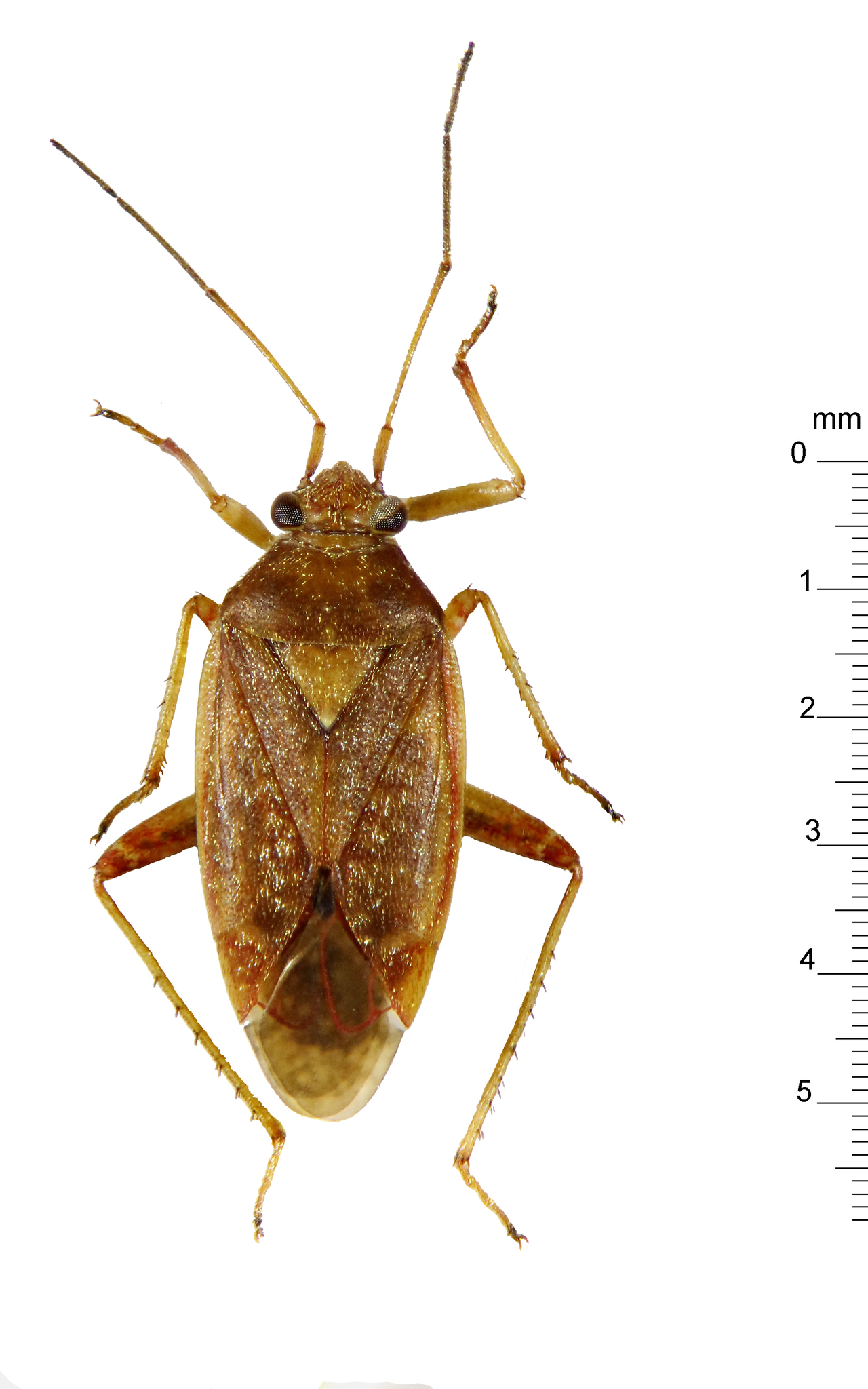
C. unicolor
