= Phytocoris obscuratus =

Scientific classification
- Kingdom: Animalia
- Phylum: Arthropoda
- Class: Insecta
- Order: Hemiptera
- Suborder: Heteroptera
- Family: Miridae
- Genus: Phytocoris
- Species: P. obscuratus

Binomial name
- Phytocoris obscuratus Carvalho, 1959

Species of true bug

Phytocoris obscuratus is a species of plant bugs belonging to the family Miridae, subfamily Mirinae. It can be found in Croatia, France, Greece, North Macedonia, Romania, and Spain.
