= Tuxedo (bug) =

Scientific classification
- Kingdom: Animalia
- Phylum: Arthropoda
- Clade: Pancrustacea
- Class: Insecta
- Order: Hemiptera
- Suborder: Heteroptera
- Family: Miridae
- Tribe: Leucophoropterini
- Genus: Tuxedo; Schuh, 2001

Genus of true bugs

Tuxedo is a genus of plant bugs in the family Miridae. There are about seven described species in Tuxedo.

== Species ==
These seven species belong to the genus Tuxedo:

- Tuxedo bicinctus (Van Duzee, 1914)^{i c g}
- Tuxedo cruralis (Van Duzee, 1917)^{i c g}
- Tuxedo drakei Schuh, 2004^{i c g}
- Tuxedo elongatus Schuh, 2004^{i c g}
- Tuxedo flavicollis (Knight, 1929)^{i c g b}
- Tuxedo nicholi (Knight, 1929)^{i c g}
- Tuxedo susansolomonae Schuh, 2004^{i c g}

Data sources: i = ITIS, c = Catalogue of Life, g = GBIF, b = Bugguide.net
