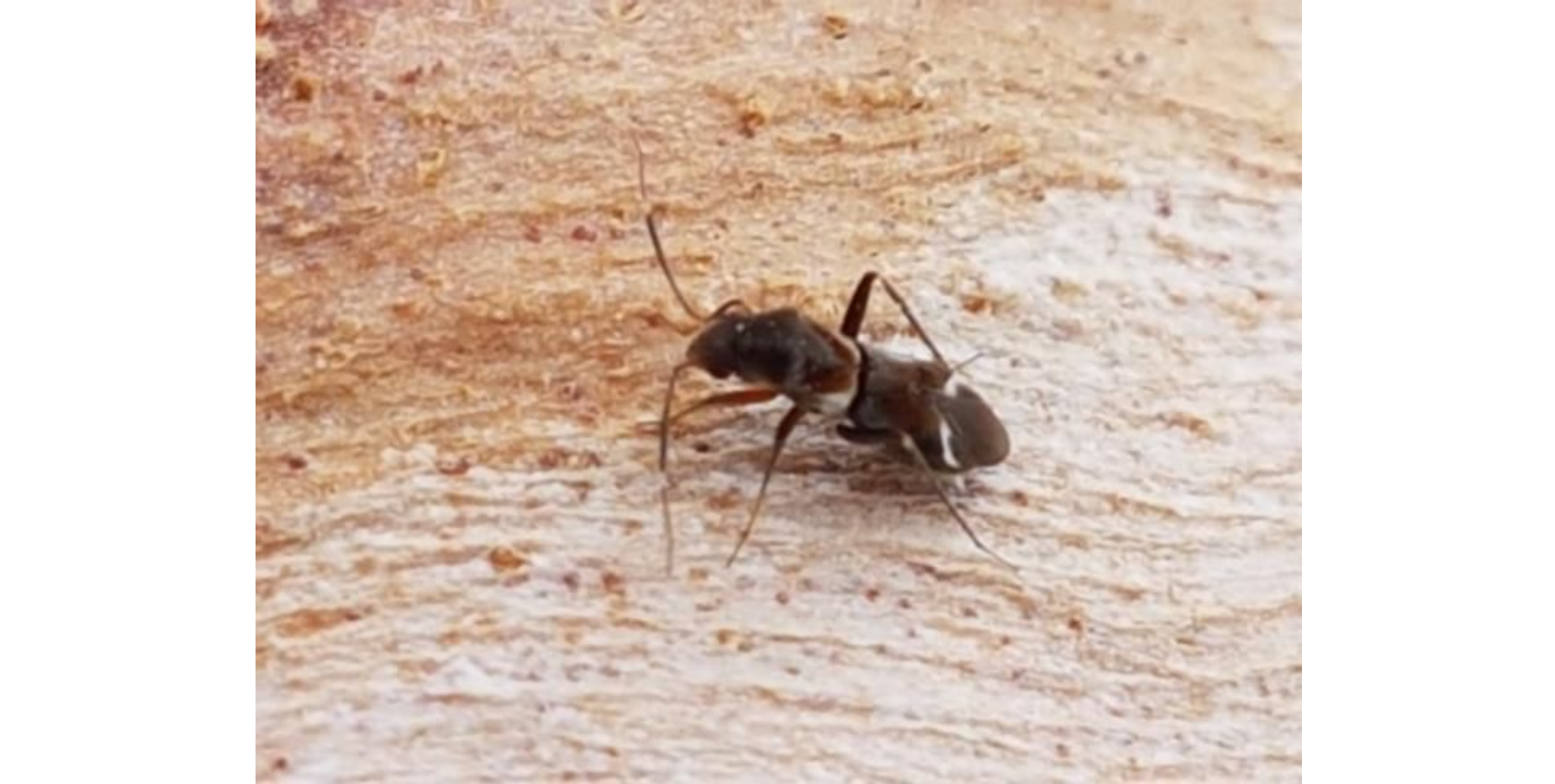
- Leucophoroptera sp.

Scientific classification
- Kingdom: Animalia
- Phylum: Arthropoda
- Class: Insecta
- Order: Hemiptera
- Suborder: Heteroptera
- Family: Miridae
- Tribe: Leucophoropterini
- Genus: Leucophoroptera; Poppius, 1921

Type species
- Leucophoroptera quadrimaculata Poppius, 1921

= Leucophoroptera =

Genus of true bugs

Leucophoroptera is a genus of plant bugs in the family Miridae. The genus was first described in 1921 by Bertil Poppius.

It is a genus whose members are found only in Oceania, and consists of five species:

- Leucophoroptera cavenda Carvalho & Gross, 1982
- Leucophoroptera fasciata Carvalho & Gross, 1982
- Leucophoroptera gloriosa Menard & Schuh, 2011
- Leucophoroptera kangarooina Menard & Schuh, 2011
- Leucophoroptera quadrimaculata Poppius, 1921
