= Neaitkenia =

Scientific classification
- Kingdom: Animalia
- Phylum: Arthropoda
- Class: Insecta
- Order: Hemiptera
- Suborder: Heteroptera
- Family: Miridae
- Subfamily: Phylinae
- Tribe: Leucophoropterini
- Genus: Neaitkenia; Menard & Schuh, 2011

Type species
- Aitkenia monteithi Carvalho and Gross, 1982

Genus of true bugs

Neaitkenia is a genus of plant bugs in the family Miridae. The genus was first described in 2011 by Katrina Menard and Randall Schuh.

There are just two species in this genus:

- Neaitkenia monteithi (Carvalho & Gross, 1982)
- Neaitkenia uptoni (Carvalho & Gross, 1982)
