= Bruno PlayHard =

American YouTube personality

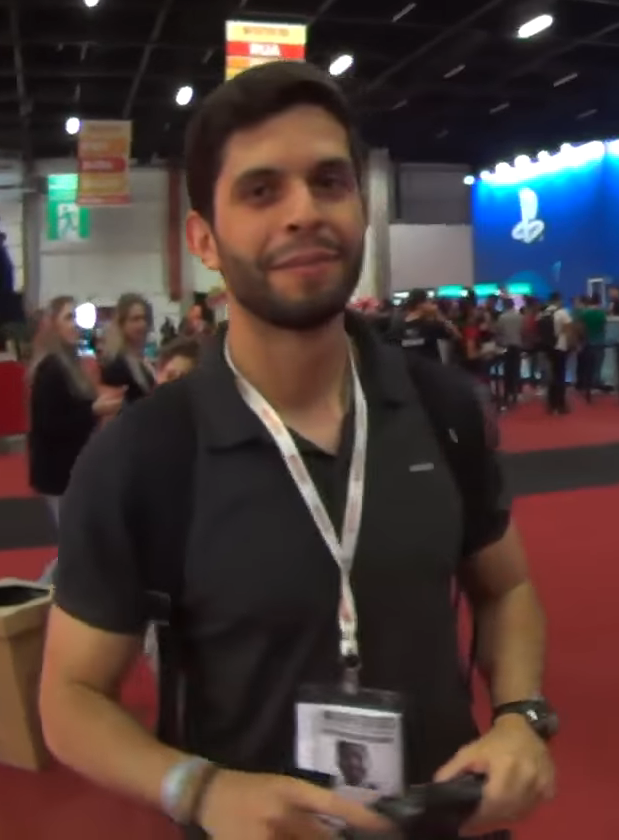
- PlayHard in 2016
- Born: Bruno Bittencourt Carvalho Oliveira; Viçosa, Minas Gerais, Brazil
- Other names: PlayHard, LOUD BrunoPH
- Education: Universidade Federal de Viçosa
- Occupation(s): YouTuber, businessperson

YouTube information
- Channel: PlayHard
- Years active: 2014–present
- Genre: Gaming
- Subscribers: 14.2 million
- Views: 2.39 billion
- Last updated: Sept 2, 2024

Bruno Bittencourt Carvalho Oliveira, also known as Bruno PlayHard, is a Brazilian YouTuber and entrepreneur, best known for founding the esports team LOUD in 2019. He appeared on Forbes Brazil's 30 Under 30 the same year. He is considered a pioneer of mobile games and one of the main names in Garena Free Fire.

Graduated in Computer Science, PlayHard did not have family support at the beginning of his career. In 2014, he created his YouTube channel which, as of December 2018, has 7 million subscribers and 700 million views. On the platform, he was best known for games like Clash of Clans, Clash Royale and Free Fire. PlayHard was one of the judges in the Mobile Games category of the eSports Brasil Award that year. In April 2018, he was part of the "Facebook Gaming Creator Pilot" program, which was intended to "help gamers connect with their audiences in game streaming." Also in 2018, he participated in the reality show from YouTube Final Level.

In February 2019, PlayHard co-founded the esports team Loud. In June 2019, Twitch rival Nimo TV was launched, with PlayHard joining the new platform's streamers team. Loud was nominated for the Best Organization of the Year category at the eSports Brasil Awards that year. The next year, PlayHard was nominated for the Personality of the Year category of the same awards.

== Books ==
- Play em Nível Hard: Jogando para Vencer na Vida e no YouTube (2019), ISBN 9788582469194
