= Peter Henry Rolfs =

American-Brazilian agronomist (1865–1944)

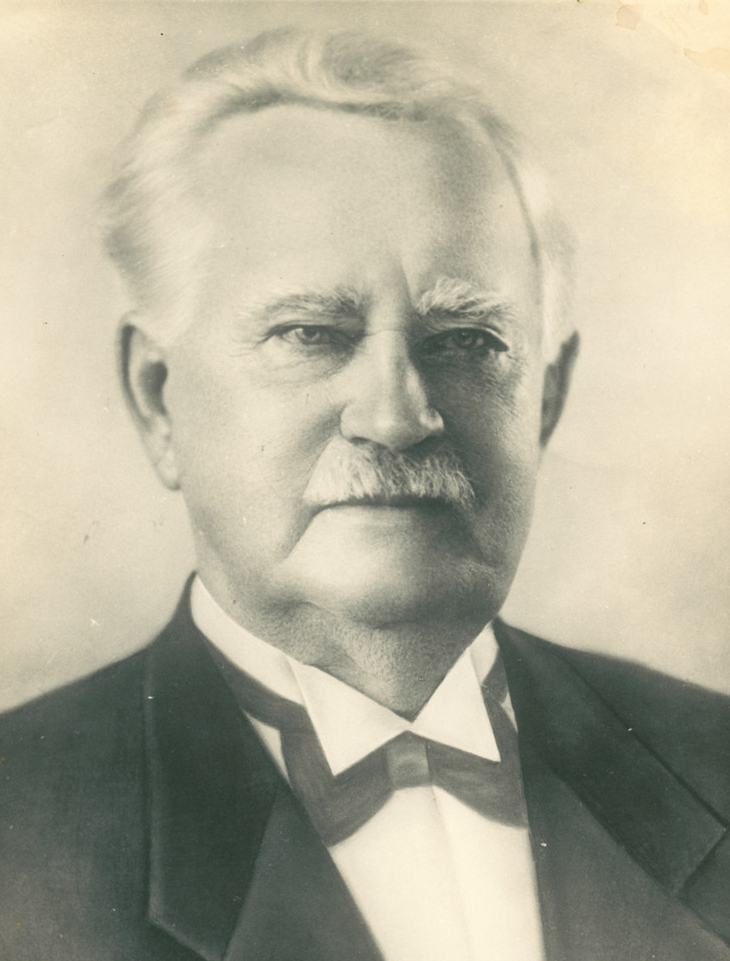
- Peter Henry Rolfs
- Born: April 17, 1865
- Died: 1944 (aged 78–79)
- Education: Iowa State University
- Known for: Founding the Universidade Federal de Viçosa
- Scientific career
- Fields: Agriculture
- Workplaces: University of Florida

Peter Henry Rolfs (1865–1944) was a prominent Florida agronomist in the early 20th century. He directed the Florida Agriculture Experiment Station from 1905 to 1920, and from 1915 to 1920 served as the Dean of the College of Agriculture at the University of Florida. Rolfs then moved to Brazil to found the Escola Superior de Agricultura e Veterinária in Viçosa, Minas Gerais, which was later renamed to Universidade Federal de Viçosa.

Rolfs was the first to describe a common plant disease in 1892 called Southern Blight caused by a sterile fungus first named in 1911 as Sclerotium rolfsii and now named Agroathelia rolfsii in honor of his pioneering research on the fungus blight.
