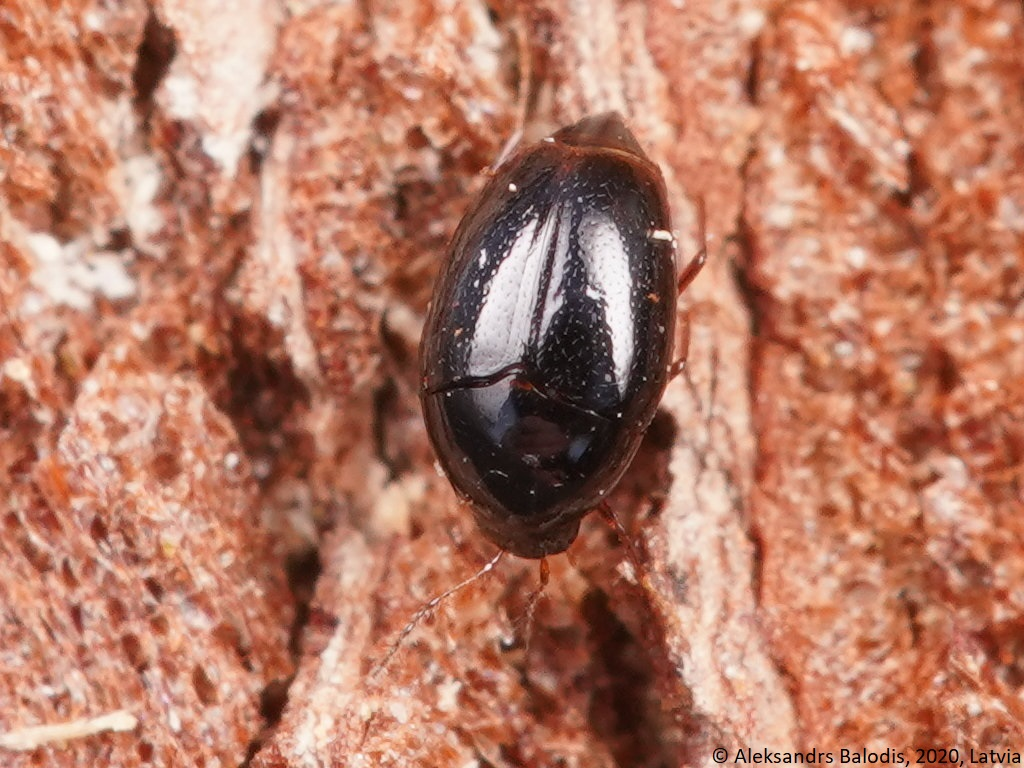
- Scaphisoma agaricinum

Scientific classification
- Domain: Eukaryota
- Kingdom: Animalia
- Phylum: Arthropoda
- Class: Insecta
- Order: Coleoptera
- Suborder: Polyphaga
- Infraorder: Staphyliniformia
- Family: Staphylinidae
- Genus: Scaphisoma; Leach, 1815

Synonyms
- Scaphosoma Agassiz, 1846; Caryoscapha Ganglbauer, 1899; Scaphiomicrus Casey, 1900; Pseudoscaphosoma Pic, 1915; Scutoscaphosoma Pic, 1916; Scaphella Achard, 1924; Macrobaeocera Pic, 1925; Macroscaphosoma Pic, 1928; Mimoscaphosoma Pic, 1928; Metalloscapha Löbl, 1975

= Scaphisoma =

Genus of beetles

Scaphisoma is a genus of beetles belonging to the family Staphylinidae.

The genus has cosmopolitan distribution.

There are 770 known species in the genus. These include:

- Scaphisoma ablutum Löbl, 2015
- Scaphisoma absurdum Löbl, 1986
- Scaphisoma iridescens Löbl & Ogawa, 2016
- Scaphisoma jacobsoni Löbl, 1975
- Scaphisoma jacqi Löbl & Ramage, 2022
- Scaphisoma hilarum von Groll, 2025
- Scaphisoma infinitum von Groll, 2025
- Scaphisoma minutipenis Löbl & Ogawa, 2016
- Scaphisoma mutabile von Groll, 2025
- Scaphisoma peculiare von Groll, 2025
- Scaphisoma repandum Casey, 1893
