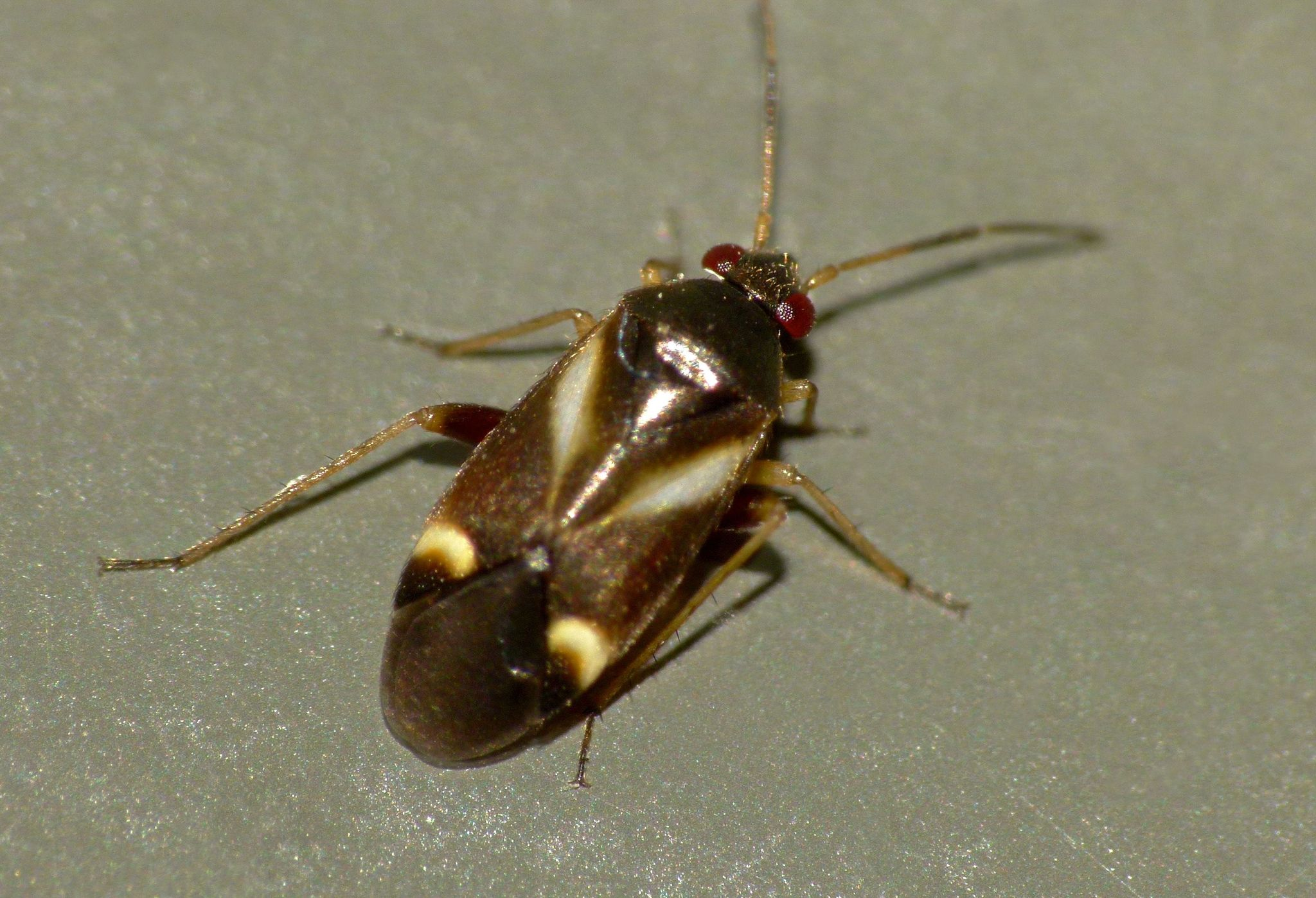
- Ausejanus albisignatus, New Zealand

Scientific classification
- Kingdom: Animalia
- Phylum: Arthropoda
- Class: Insecta
- Order: Hemiptera
- Suborder: Heteroptera
- Family: Miridae
- Subfamily: Phylinae
- Tribe: Leucophoropterini; Schuh, 1974

Subtribes
- Leucophoropterina Schuh, 1974; Tuxedoina Schuh & Menard, 2013

= Leucophoropterini =

Tribe of true bugs

Leucophoropterini is a tribe of plant bugs in the family Miridae. There are more than 20 genera and over 100 species in Leucophoropterini. Most species of this tribe are found in eastern Asia and Australia, with a single genus, Tuxedo, found in North America.

== Genera ==
These 26 genera belong to the tribe Leucophoropterini:

Subtribe Leucophoropterina Schuh, 1974
Abuyogocoris Schuh, 1984 - eastern Asia
Aitkenia Carvalho & Gross, 1982 - Australia
Arafuramiris Schuh, 1984 - eastern Asia, Australia
Ausejanus Menard & Schuh, 2011 - Australia, New Zealand
Austrodapus Menard & Schuh, 2011 - Australia
Biromiris Schuh, 1984 - eastern Asia, Australia
Blesingia Carvalho & Gross, 1982 - eastern Asia, Australia
Collessicoris Carvalho & Gross, 1982 - Australia
Ctypomiris Schuh, 1984 - eastern Asia
Gulacapsus Schuh, 1984 - eastern Asia, Australia
Johnstonsonius Menard & Schuh, 2011 - eastern Asia
Leucophoroptera Poppius, 1921 - Australia
Missanos Menard & Schuh, 2011 - eastern Asia
Neaitkenia Menard & Schuh, 2011 - Australia
Neoleucophoroptera Menard & Schuh, 2011 - eastern Asia
Papuamimus Schuh, 1984 - eastern Asia
Papuamiroides Menard & Schuh, 2011 - eastern Asia
Pseudohallodapocoris Schuh, 1984 - eastern Asia
Sejanus Distant, 1910 - eastern Asia, Australia
Solomonomimus Schuh, 1984 - eastern Asia
Transleucophoroptera Menard & Schuh, 2011 - eastern Asia
Trichocephalocapsus Schuh, 1984 - eastern Asia
Waterhouseana Carvalho, 1973 - eastern Asia
Subtribe Tuxedoina Schuh & Menard, 2013
Ephippiocoris Poppius, 1912 - Palearctic
Pseudophylus Yasunaga, 1999 - Palearctic
Tuxedo Schuh, 2001 - western North America
