= José Cândido de Melo Carvalho =

Brazilian entomologist (1914–1994)

- Born: June 11, 1914; Carmo do Rio Claro, Minas Gerais, Brazil
- Died: October 22, 1994 (aged 80); Rio de Janeiro
- Education: D.V.M. Universidade Federal de Viçosa; Ph.D. University of Iowa
- Known for: Studies on Miridae (Hemiptera)
- Scientific career
- Fields: Zoology, entomology
- Workplaces: Museu Nacional do Rio de Janeiro
- Author abbrev. (zoology): J.C.M. Carvalho. Carvelho

José Cândido de Melo Carvalho (June 11, 1914 – October 22, 1994) was a Brazilian zoologist who specialized in entomology and was a world authority on the true bugs or Hemiptera. He was director of the Museu Paraense Emílio Goeldi (1955–1960), in Belém, and of the Museu Nacional do Rio de Janeiro. His abilities both in science and in the field of politics helped Brazil to develop and maintain a high level of systematic biology.

Carvalho published more than 500 papers on the taxonomy of the Miridae, as well as studies of other insect groups. Between 1957 and 1960 his catalog of the Miridae of the world was published by the National Museum, totaling more than 1,100 pages.

He coordinated the edition of "Atlas da Fauna Brasileira", a book on Brazilian animals.

In addition, he published on the knowledge of animals by Indians of the Xingu River basin, and on the explorations of early naturalists in the Amazon.

He was a member of the Vatican Academy of Sciences, and Vice President of the Brazilian National Research Council.

He participated in the 1936 Olympics in Berlin, at which time he became friends with future Brazilian president Castelo Branco.
