= Viçosa, Minas Gerais =

Viçosa
- Municipality
- Municipality of Viçosa
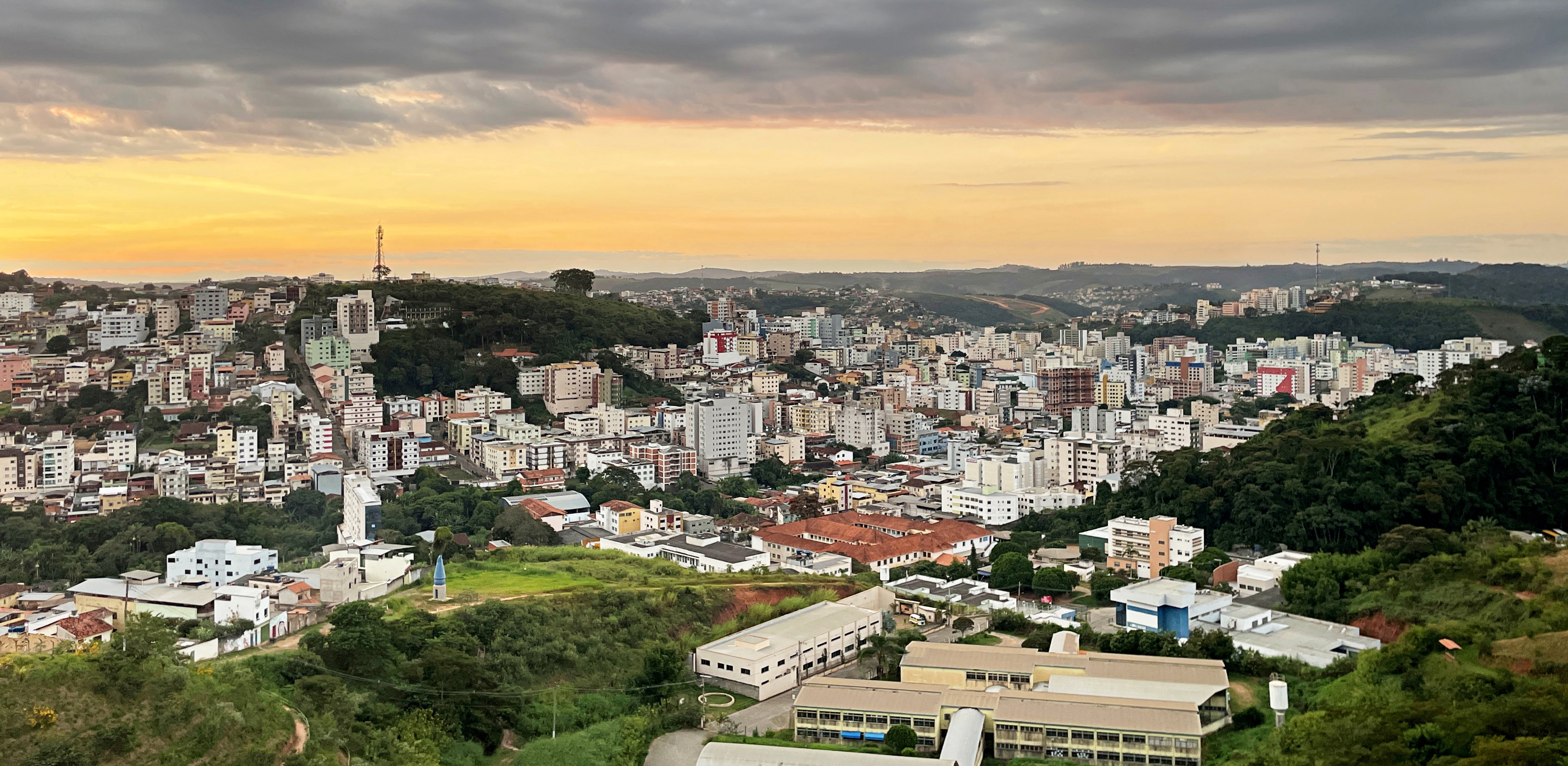
- Partial view of Viçosa

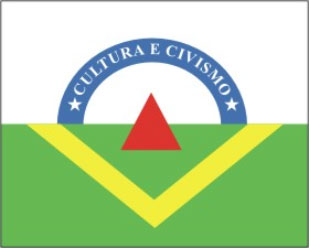
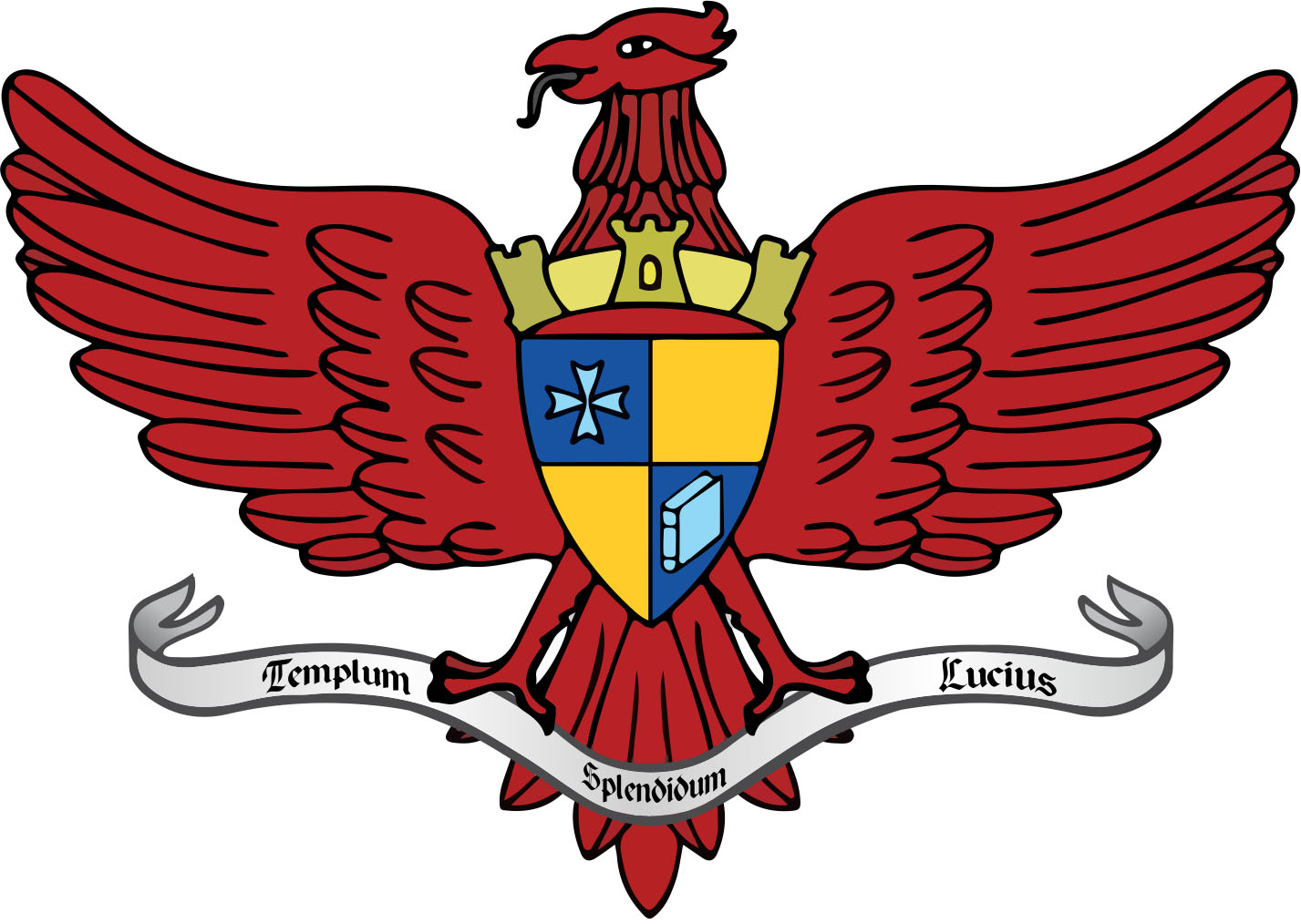
- Flag Coat of arms
- Nickname: College Town
- Motto: Culture and civility
- Location of Viçosa in the state of Minas Gerais

- Location of Viçosa in Brazil
- Coordinates: 20°45′14″S 42°52′55″W
- Country: Brazil
- Region: Southeast
- State: Minas Gerais
- District: 13 October 1831
- Village: 30 September 1871
- County: 20 January 1873

Government
  - Mayor: Ângelo Chequer (PSDB)
  - Deputy mayor: Arnaldo Dias de Andrade PSB

Area
  - Total: 299.397 km^{2} (115.598 sq mi)
- Elevation: 648 m (2,126 ft)

Population (2020)
  - Total: 79,388
  - Density: 265.16/km^{2} (686.76/sq mi)
- Time zone: UTC−3 (BRT)
- Postal code: [36574004]
- Area code: +55 (31)
- HDI (2010): 0.775 – high
- Website: www.vicosa.mg.gov.br

Viçosa is a Brazilian municipality in the state of Minas Gerais. Its population as of 2021 was estimated at 79,910 inhabitants.

It is a city essentially oriented to education, with emphasis on the Federal University of Viçosa, founded in 1926 by the president of the Republic Artur da Silva Bernardes, who was born in Viçosa. It also possesses other private higher education institutions, emphasizing the educational character of the city. It is a city that attracts many people from Brazil and other countries due to scientific and academic events that take place around the university, totaling approximately 500 annual events.

== History ==
=== Foundation ===
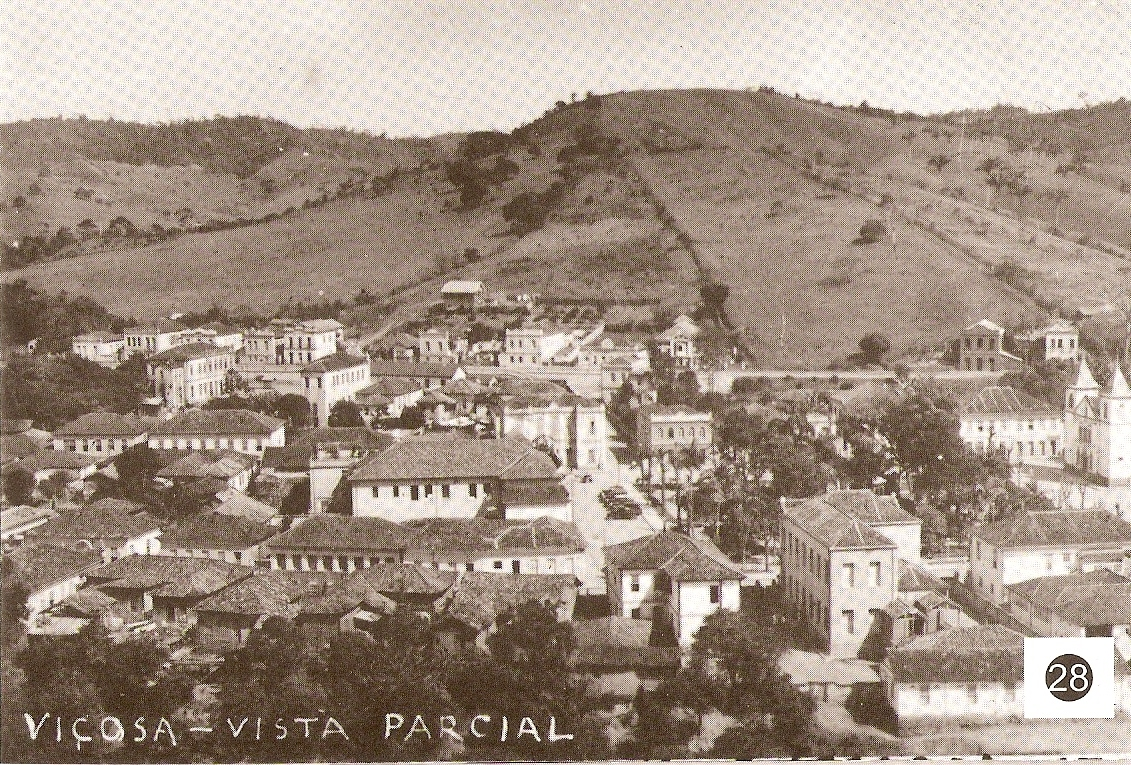
Viçosa, 1932

Before colonization, the Piranga River basin region was inhabited by the indigenous Aimoré and Purí people, who with the Tamoios belonged to the Tupi group. Although traversed by some bandeirantes in the seventeenth century, it remained occupied by natives until then.

The white European settlement of the region began in the eighteenth century in the settlements located on the banks of the Caminho Novo (New Path) – a road opened by the colonial government for gold to be taken straight from the Minas region to Rio de Janeiro, shortening the route and maintaining its monopoly, which was previously through the Mantiqueira Mountains, passing through the Serra do Mar and the Ilha Grande bay, on the São Paulo coast, only then reach Rio de Janeiro. This settlement happened tentatively at first, since the Portuguese Crown prohibited the occupation of the Sertões do Leste region.

With the decline of the gold production in Minas Gerais, several explorers and their families moved from the mining towns to the Zona da Mata. This region was considered an agricultural frontier, without large white European housing settlements, until the first half of the eighteenth century.

The current northern region of Zona da Mata would be populated by white Europeans with the incentive of the governor of the captaincy of Minas, who, around 1781, distributed to this privileged population hundreds of sesmarias dedicated to the search for gold. The population was strongly boosted throughout the nineteenth century by the expansion of coffee farming. Besides this, other economic activities developed, such as trade and other services associated with its cultivation, still under the regime of enslavement of black and indigenous people.

The white European occupation of Viçosa began properly in the nineteenth century. On March 8, 1800, Father Francisco José da Silva obtained permission from the bishop of Mariana – Friar Cipriano – to erect a hermitage in honor of Saint Rita of Cascia, where the chapel of Our Lord of Passos is situated today on Passos Street, center of the district headquarters; the region became the patrimony of Saint Rita of Cascia. The construction of the chapel is the starting point of the process of occupation carried out by the Catholic Church, to the detriment of other religious manifestations, which would become the town of Santa Rita do Turvo – the toponym of the hermitage that marked the town's founding plus the name of the main river that crosses the town, Turvo.

In 1813, as the settlement grew, it was decided to construct a new Catholic church on the site of today's Praça Silviano Brandão. The construction of a new Catholic church to the patron saint in another place caused the axis of urban expansion to move towards a flatter area, near the Ribeirão São Bartolomeu valley, with better conditions to erect new buildings, favoring the growth of the town .

On October 13, 1831, the current town of Rio Pomba, 100 km (62 mi) from Viçosa, was elevated to the category of village, passing Santa Rita do Turvo to become one of its 14 initial districts (in 1837 there were 20).

The initial layout of the city center changed little over time, even with the local expansion and creation of new streets. However, by the end of the nineteenth century, the territory of Santa Rita do Turvo was significantly divided. The town was divided into three regions: the Patrimony of Santa Rita (Rita of Cascia), in Rua dos Passos; the Patrimony of the Mother Church, where the current sanctuary and the block between the Senador Vaz de Mello and Artur Bernardes streets, Rosário Square, going from São Bartolomeu Stream to Conceição Stream; and the Patrimony of San Francisco which covered the area where the Dr. Cristóvão Lopes de Carvalho Square, Padre Serafim Street and the Dom Viçoso Cemetery are currently located.

According to José Mário Rangel, on July 14, 1832, the District of Santa Rita do Turvo separated from the Parish of Pomba and became a parish. On August 31, 1833, the Parish of Santa Rita was founded, which at the time was also a political division. In 1851 the first mother church was inaugurated, built on the old necropolis that was in front of the chapel located in what is today the Praça Silviano Brandão, with its demolition after the construction was completed.

As a result of Provincial Law No. 1,871, of September 30, 1871, Santa Rita do Turvo was elevated to a village of the same name. It was composed then of five districts: Santa Rita do Turvo (seat), São Sebastião dos Aflitos de Arrepiados and Curato de Coimbra (separated from the municipality of Ubá), São Miguel do Anta (separated from Ponte Nova) and Barra do Bacalhao (separated from Mariana). The village was elevated to the category of city, municipality, effectively three years later (June 3, 1876), with the name of Viçosa de Santa Rita, in honor of the seventh Bishop of Mariana, Dom Antônio Ferreira Viçoso. On January 22, 1873, the installation of the municipality took place, with the inauguration of the building to be the headquarters of the city hall and jail on the site of the current property number 136 of the Praça Silviano Brandão, on the right corner with Rua dos Passos. The city hall began operations on April 12, 1877, when Brazil was still ruled by Dom Pedro II. Its first president was councilman Carlos Vaz de Mello who later became senator of the Empire.

By Provincial Law No. 3171, of October 18, 1883, and State Law No. 2, of September 14, 1891, the district of Santo Antônio dos Teixeiras was created and attached to the municipality of Viçosa de Santa Rita. By Provincial Law 3387, of July 10, 1886, the district of São Sebastião dos Aflitos de Arrepiados was renamed São Sebastião do Erval. By State Decree No. 227, of November 6, 1890, and State Law No. 2, of September 14, 1891, the district of São Vicente do Grama was created and attached to the municipality of Viçosa de Santa Rita.

Former central train station of Viçosa

On December 21, 1885, during the administration of Artur Bernardes, the then president of the city council of Viçosa for two legislatures, Carlos Vaz de Mello, managed through political influence to have the railroad arrive in Viçosa. The arrival of the "iron train" of the Leopoldina Railway, whose station was 6 km (3.7 mi) from Viçosa – at what is now called Estação Velha or Estação de Silvestre – was the landmark of the arrival of developmental progress to the city.

In 1911 the municipality would be called simply Viçosa. The distance from the train station to the city center made it difficult to board and disembark passengers, since it was only possible to get there by ox cart, carriages and other means. This situation lasted for almost 30 years, until the Leopoldina station was transferred to the city center, and its inauguration took place on August 21, 1914, when the local population had already reached two thousand inhabitants. From there the city was finally linked to the capital of the country, Rio de Janeiro. With the construction of the railway station near the central part of the city, consolidated by the construction of the new Mother Church of Saint Rita, the center expanded, and in its surroundings commerce, hotels and new residences, mainly of eclectic design, began to be established. The growth around the railway station is a common pattern among the cities of Zona da Mata, Minas Gerais.

With this new connection between the city of Viçosa and the coast, the first families who would form the Lebanese and Italian colony arrived in the city. Some Lebanese came as peddlers and began trading in fabrics, haberdashery and footwear, which was an insignificant trade until the mid-twentieth century. Also at the same time the first Italians arrived, who were mostly craftsmen, tailors, and coppersmiths. Although small, along with the black population, these groups participated actively in the development of Viçosa. They brought their customs, their beliefs and their values, enriching the local cultural heritage.

In 1908, the House of Charity of Viçosa (Casa de Caridade de Viçosa) was founded, which is today the Hospital São Sebastião (initially built at Avenue Bueno Brandão, only moving to the present location at Rua Tenente Kummel, with the end of the building construction in 1930). In 1922 the Regional Hospital was inaugurated at Afonso Pena Street (as part of the Public Health Plan of the then President of the State of Minas Gerais, Dr. Artur Bernardes).

In 1913, a private company was founded with capital from shares, with the name of Gymnasio de Viçosa (the institution that gave rise to the current Doctor Raimundo Alves Torres State School, Escola Estadual Doutor Raimundo Alves Torres – ESEDRAT), in Praça Silviano Brandão. In 1917 the Nossa Senhora do Carmo Normal School was founded in Viçosa (now Carmo College) run by the Carmelite Sisters of Divine Providence and was attached to it for a short time before separating and dedicating itself exclusively to female education. Most significantly, both have become benchmarks of high educational quality in the city and region.

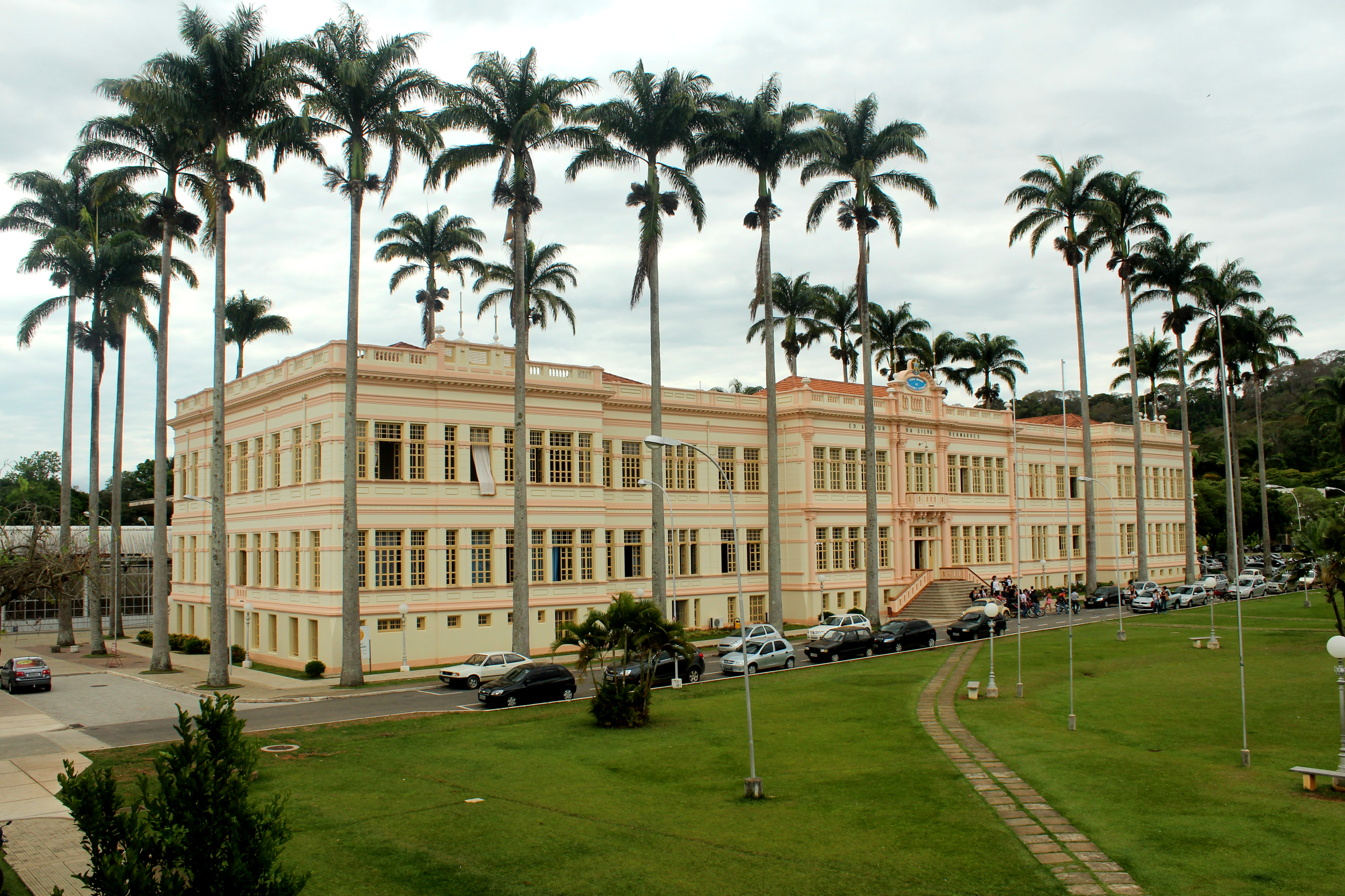
Federal University of Viçosa - Main Building

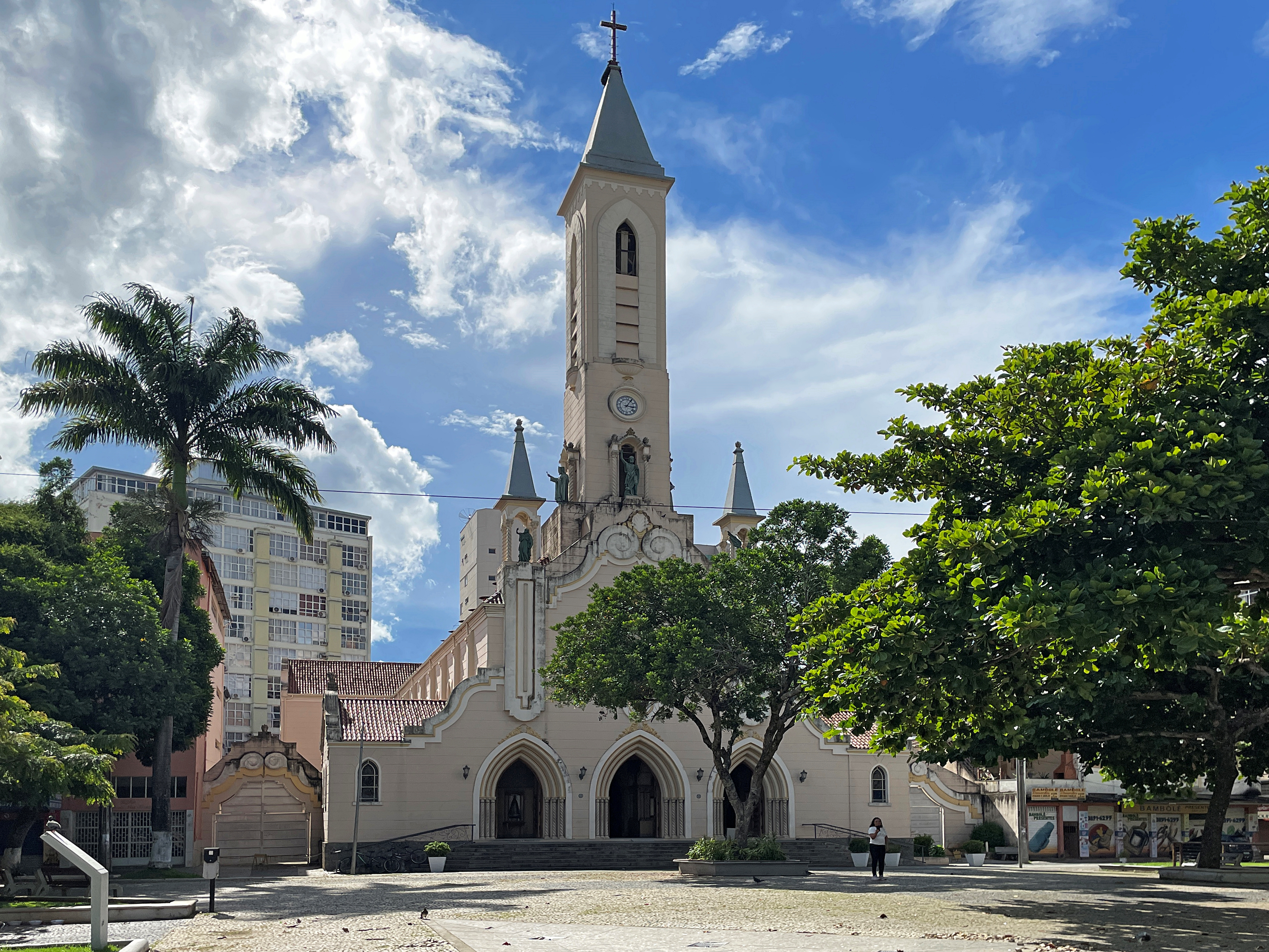
Silviano Brandão Square with the Shrine of Saint Rita of Cascia in the background

A Escola Superior de Agricultura e Veterinária (ESAV; the Higher School of Agriculture and Veterinary Science) was founded in 1926, by the then president of Brazil and former mayor of Viçosa, Arthur da Silva Bernardes. He participated in its construction and hired João Carlos Bello Lisboa as assistant engineer. Its first director was Professor Peter Henry Rolfs, who brought an educational model used in schools in Florida, United States, based on the three-fold "Teaching, Research and Extension" concept that soon spread throughout the rest of the country. In 1948 the Superior School became Universidade Rural do Estado de Minas Gerais, (Rural University of the State of Minas Gerais), UREMG. In 1969, it was federalized, becoming the Federal University of Viçosa Foundation. Significant events in the institution's history are reflected in the growth of the city – important personalities for the university are also important personalities for Viçosa. Its establishment within the urban perimeter constitutes a crystallizing factor in one of the city's vectors. The institution attracts people in search of employment and brings students and professors from various parts of the country, promoting the growth and expansion of the city.

In the 1950s, the city underwent significant redevelopment, as well as the construction of important buildings. P. H. Rolfs and Santa Rita Avenues were renovated, the old city hall building (located in Praça do Rosário) was completed and the Cine Brasil building (corner of Praça do Rosário and Rua Padre Serafim) was built, which would become a cultural reference for decades. The construction of the Colégio de Viçosa (current city hall) was begun. The Rosário and Silviano Brandão Plazas were redesigned and the new Mother Church of Santa Rita was erected next to the old one. The construction of the new Catholic church, much larger and more solid than the previous one, at that time, is considered a "milestone for the progress and expansion of the municipality".

In the territorial division dated December 31, 1963, the municipality consisted of three districts: Viçosa, Cachoeira de Santa Cruz and Silvestre. Law No. 001/92, dated January 14, 1992, created the district of São José do Triunfo. Currently, the Municipality of Viçosa has four districts: Viçosa (seat), Cachoeira de Santa Cruz, São José do Triunfo and Silvestre.

The process of settlement in the city's urban space is closely linked to the implementation of the Federal University of Viçosa (Universidade Federal de Viçosa, UFV). Initially the institution itself was responsible for meeting the students' housing needs, and built the first dormitory in the 1920s (now also known as the old dormitory) and a women's dormitory in the late 1960s. At the same time, Vila Giannetti was built on the university campus, designed to be a residence for professors, bringing to the city one of the rare examples of Modernist urbanism in the interior of the country.

From the federalization of the institution in 1969 and the creation of new courses in the 1970s, there was a change in the daily life of the city, whose dynamics began to evolve due to the university. At that time, the students were no longer fully served by the university's own housing, and eventually settled in the center of the city in boarding houses or rented housing because of the area's proximity to the campus. This intensified the densification process of the city center and nearby neighborhoods. The presence of buildings in the central area marked this decade, as well as the verticalization process of the Ramos neighborhood, in its lower part near the center, and in the beginning of the Clélia Bernardes neighborhood, mainly along the Avenue Olívia de Castro Almeida. Simultaneously, teachers began to look for areas far from the city center, thus creating the first horizontal condominiums, such as the condominium Residencial Bosque do Acamari in 1983. It also marks the beginning of the verticalization process, with buildings with up to four floors. The verticalization trend continues in the Ramos and Clélia Bernardes neighborhood, as well as in the area of Praça Silviano Brandão, Avenida Santa Rita and Rua Gomes Barbosa. During this period, the first buildings of commercial use and services appeared as well. The Panorama building, 12 stories high, was the first to have elevators in the city, still in the 1970s.

The absence of passenger trains since the 1980s encouraged the deactivation of the line in 1994, in the stretches Três Rios–Ligação and Ponte Nova–Caratinga.

In the 1990s, the verticalization process of the center intensified, with the appearance of taller buildings, with a total of about 10 floors. However, with the lack of land in the center proper and the driving factor of UFV, the tendency to verticalization moved to Avenida P. H. Rolfs and its surroundings, Ladeira dos Operários and Rua José Antônio Rodrigues, near the "Quatro Pilastras", as well as Avenida Santa Rita and Rua Gomes Barbosa. It was also in the 1990s that the neighborhoods of Fátima, Lourdes, São Sebastião, Santo Antônio, and João Braz, among others, began to verticalize, although to a lesser degree, around five floors.

Since 2001, private higher education institutions have been installed in the city close to the BR-120 highway, establishing a new urban growth vector. The construction of these institutions reinforces the service sector industry. Historical facts linked to UFV directly influenced the historical and social evolution of the municipality.

The verticalization process of the city and the uncontrolled arrival of new students caused, in addition to structural problems, complaints by the people of Viçosa about the quality of life. On March 17, 2011, after several popular demonstrations about the non-compliance with the noise law, it was imposed that establishments open at night with sound insulation could only operate until 3:00 a.m.; the others should close until 2:00 a.m., as stated in the Code of Ordinances of the Municipality of Viçosa.

The local economy, based on the service sector, is dependent on the floating population, which resides mostly during the school term in the city. Urban expansion happens in an organic way, adding to already saturated regions and with old infrastructure. There are currently discussions in society about the benefits and harms of not controlling the local growth model. There are problems with rainwater drainage, transportation, paving, occupancy in hazardous areas, suppression of water courses, visual pollution, sewage and water supply systems, and problems with the electrical supply. The university participates in the discussions, since it directly influences the city.

Despite the urban problems, the municipality stands out as a micro-regional hub, meeting a demand of almost 200,000 inhabitants who come to Viçosa in search of health, education and commerce services. The municipality has become a cultural hub by promoting large events. In addition, research conducted by higher education institutions has led the city to become a scientific hub.

In April 2011, the Parque Tecnológico de Viçosa (the Technology Park of Viçosa, TecnoParq) was inaugurated, which is a partnership between UFV, the Government of Minas Gerais, and city hall. The Parque Tecnológico de Viçosa, the first in Minas Gerais, has been under development since the early 2000s, with several incubated companies, as well as numerous initiatives already developed. With the inauguration of the headquarters, it now has a more appropriate space for the development of ideas, which makes a technological park different from an industrial one. TecnoParq is housed in the revitalized and expanded facilities of the former Artur Bernardes Agricultural School, linked to the now-defunct Fundação Nacional do Bem-Estar do Menor ('National Foundation of Child Welfare', Funabem. The facilities are located off the BR-120 highway, about 5 km (3.1 mi) from the UFV campus.

== Geography ==
=== Climate ===
Viçosa has a humid subtropical climate (Köppen: Cwa) with rainy summers and warm, dry winters.

Climate data for Viçosa, Minas Gerais (1991–2020 normals, extremes 1942–present)
Month	Jan	Feb	Mar	Apr	May	Jun	Jul	Aug	Sep	Oct	Nov	Dec	Year
Record high °C (°F)	36.5 (97.7)	35.6 (96.1)	34.2 (93.6)	35.2 (95.4)	32.2 (90.0)	31.0 (87.8)	32.0 (89.6)	33.8 (92.8)	37.6 (99.7)	38.2 (100.8)	36.8 (98.2)	34.8 (94.6)	38.2 (100.8)
Mean daily maximum °C (°F)	28.9 (84.0)	29.8 (85.6)	28.7 (83.7)	27.5 (81.5)	25.0 (77.0)	24.3 (75.7)	24.4 (75.9)	25.9 (78.6)	26.8 (80.2)	27.7 (81.9)	27.3 (81.1)	28.4 (83.1)	27.1 (80.8)
Daily mean °C (°F)	22.8 (73.0)	23.0 (73.4)	22.3 (72.1)	20.9 (69.6)	18.1 (64.6)	16.7 (62.1)	16.4 (61.5)	17.6 (63.7)	19.5 (67.1)	21.1 (70.0)	21.5 (70.7)	22.5 (72.5)	20.2 (68.4)
Mean daily minimum °C (°F)	19.0 (66.2)	18.8 (65.8)	18.4 (65.1)	16.8 (62.2)	13.8 (56.8)	11.9 (53.4)	11.3 (52.3)	11.8 (53.2)	14.2 (57.6)	16.5 (61.7)	17.9 (64.2)	18.8 (65.8)	15.8 (60.4)
Record low °C (°F)	12.2 (54.0)	10.3 (50.5)	9.8 (49.6)	5.6 (42.1)	3.2 (37.8)	1.2 (34.2)	1.8 (35.2)	1.8 (35.2)	2.6 (36.7)	4.8 (40.6)	8.0 (46.4)	8.6 (47.5)	1.2 (34.2)
Average precipitation mm (inches)	236.0 (9.29)	116.9 (4.60)	163.3 (6.43)	58.0 (2.28)	34.2 (1.35)	15.5 (0.61)	7.7 (0.30)	10.4 (0.41)	49.7 (1.96)	99.2 (3.91)	204.8 (8.06)	265.9 (10.47)	1,261.6 (49.67)
Average precipitation days (≥ 1.0 mm)	13.4	9.4	11.0	5.2	3.5	2.0	1.2	1.7	4.9	8.0	13.4	15.0	88.7
Average relative humidity (%)	80.1	78.9	82.4	82.3	83.4	83.5	80.8	74.8	72.2	74.1	79.5	81.3	79.4
Average dew point °C (°F)	19.7 (67.5)	19.8 (67.6)	19.8 (67.6)	18.5 (65.3)	16.2 (61.2)	14.9 (58.8)	14.2 (57.6)	14.2 (57.6)	15.1 (59.2)	16.9 (62.4)	18.3 (64.9)	19.6 (67.3)	17.3 (63.1)
Mean monthly sunshine hours	173.0	186.5	182.4	184.4	185.8	187.1	205.4	213.6	172.7	163.3	133.3	148.0	2,135.5
Source 1: NOAA
Source 2: Instituto Nacional de Meteorologia

== Notable people ==
- Welisson Silva — Brazilian weightlifter
- Bruno PlayHard — YouTuber

== See also ==
- List of municipalities in Minas Gerais
