= Federal University of Viçosa =

Public university in Viçosa, Minas Gerais, Brazil

- Universidade Federal de Viçosa
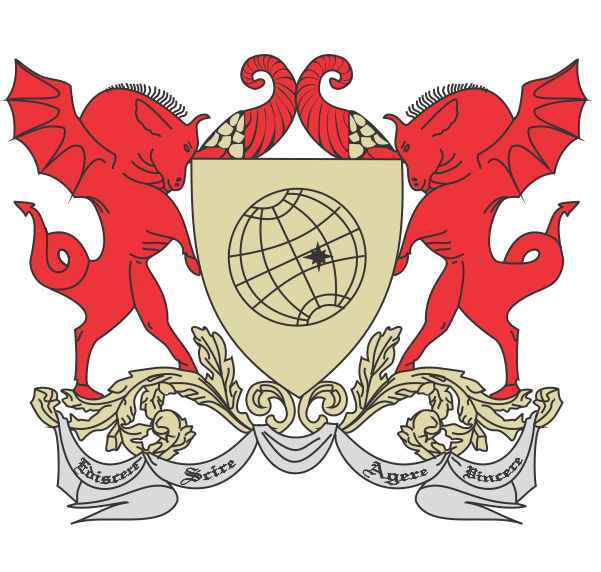
- Other name: UFV
- Motto: Ediscere, Scire, Agere, Vincere
- Motto in English: Study, Know, Act, Win
- Type: Public
- Established: March 30, 1922
- Budget: R$ 888.899.427,42
- Rector: Demetrius David da Silva
- Academic staff: 1,286 (2017)
- Administrative staff: 2.298 (2017)
- Students: 19,860 (2017)
- Undergraduates: 14,734 (2017)
- Postgraduates: 3,496 (2017)
- Location: Viçosa, Minas Gerais, Brazil; 20°45′37″S 42°52′04″W
- Campus: Urban
- Campus Location: three cities: Viçosa; Florestal; Rio Paranaíba
- Colours: Or, Sable and Gules
- Mascot: Capybara
- Website: www.ufv.br
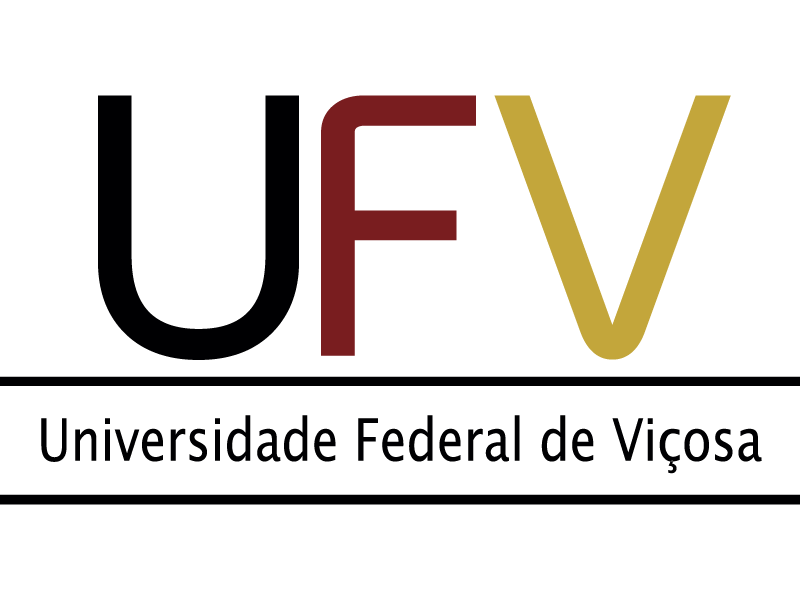

The Federal University of Viçosa (Portuguese: Universidade Federal de Viçosa, UFV) is a public university with the main campus located in the city of Viçosa, Minas Gerais, Brazil. It also has campuses in the cities Rio Paranaiba and Florestal.

Recognized as one of the best public universities of Brazil, it is known for agricultural sciences and exact sciences. Other highlighted courses are law, food engineering, agronomy, zootechny, electrical engineering, nursing, nutrition, and medicine.

Founded in 1922 as the Higher School of Agriculture and Veterinary Science (Portuguese: Escola Superior de Agricultura e Veterinária, ESAV), classes did not begin until 1927. In 1948 it became the Rural University of Minas Gerais. It was federalized in 1969 with its present name. The university houses the Technological Park of Viçosa (tecnoPARQ), and one of the biggest networks of junior enterprises in the country.

== History ==
=== Foundation ===
The Federal University of Viçosa was founded via law number 761 in September 1920 signed by the President of the State of Minas Gerais Artur Bernardes, along with the Secretary of Agriculture of Minas Gerais Clodomiro Augusto de Oliveira, who authorized the implementation of a superior school of Agriculture and Veterinary in the state.

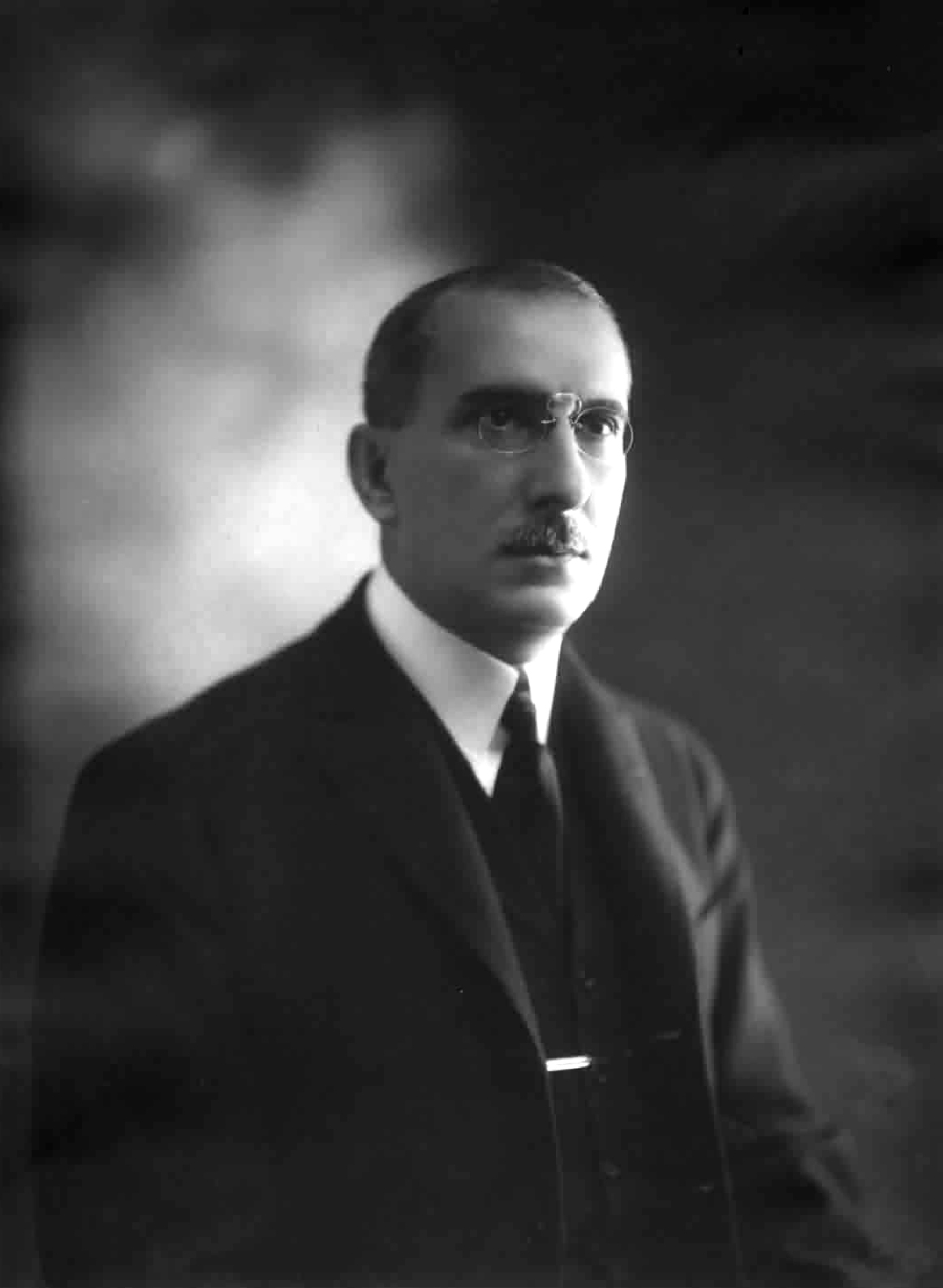
Artur Bernardes - Portrait

Clause number 4 - This School will have as its objective to lecture the practical and theorical tuition of Agriculture and Veterinary and so to realize experimental studies that take part in the development of those sciences in the state of Minas Gerais.

— Law number 761, of 6 of September of 1920

In 1920, determined by Artur Bernardes to the Brazilian ambassador in the United States José Cochrane de Alencar the mission to indicate a specialist capable of "founding, organizing and directing a modern agricultural school". This way, by the action of the Department of State and of Agriculture of the United States, the Director of Florida Agricultural College, the doctor Peter Henry Rolfs was entrusted in 1921 after accepting the challenge of serving the State of Minas and managing the physical and academical construction of the Superior School of Agriculture and Veterinary.

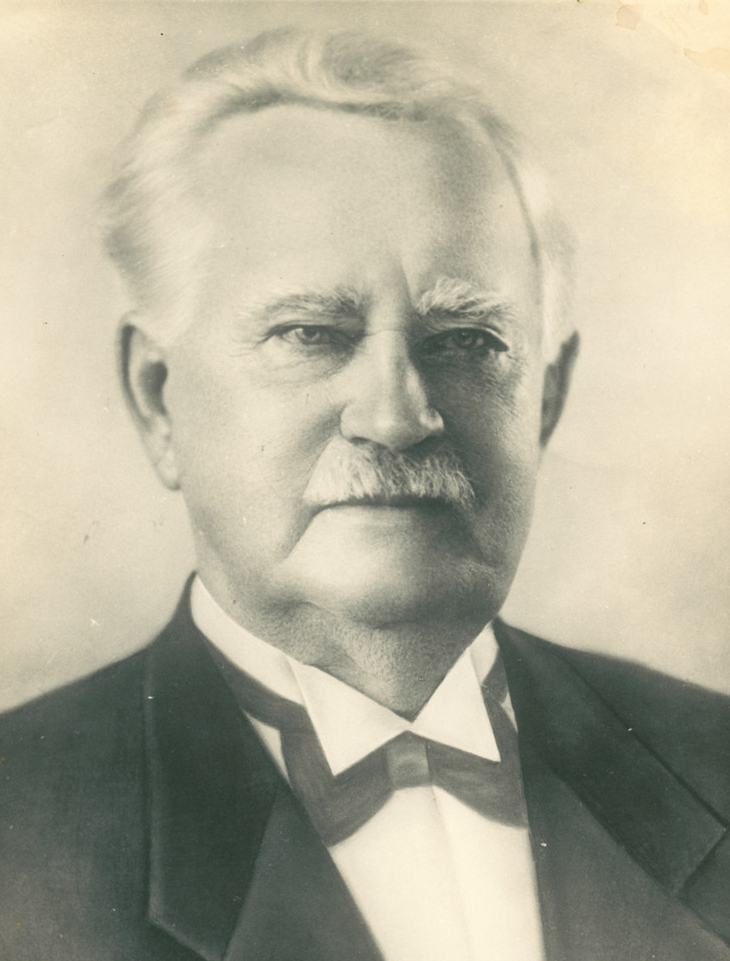
Portrait of Peter Henry Rolfs, (P.H. Rolfs)

The professor Rolfs was contracted with the function of founding, organizing and directing the School. With a considerable title for the time, and a deep knowledge and experience in the area of modern agriculture in the United States, Rolfs came with the function of implementing in the Superior School of Agriculture and Veterinary a modern agricultural model, based on the pragmatic scientific methods of the Land Grant Colleges, which would supply a big progress for the local, regional, and national agriculture. The Superior School of Agriculture and Veterinary was created with the goal of becoming an icon of the agricultural science in Brazil, being necessary in its beginning human and physical resources that gave support to receive the innovator teaching method that was imported from the United States. Thinking in the excellency of the teaching that would be offered by the institution, the School was populated in its beginning by teachers of different parts of the world and of Brazil, also from employees and students that came from different parts of Brazil, including from Viçosa itself.

==== Four pilasters ====
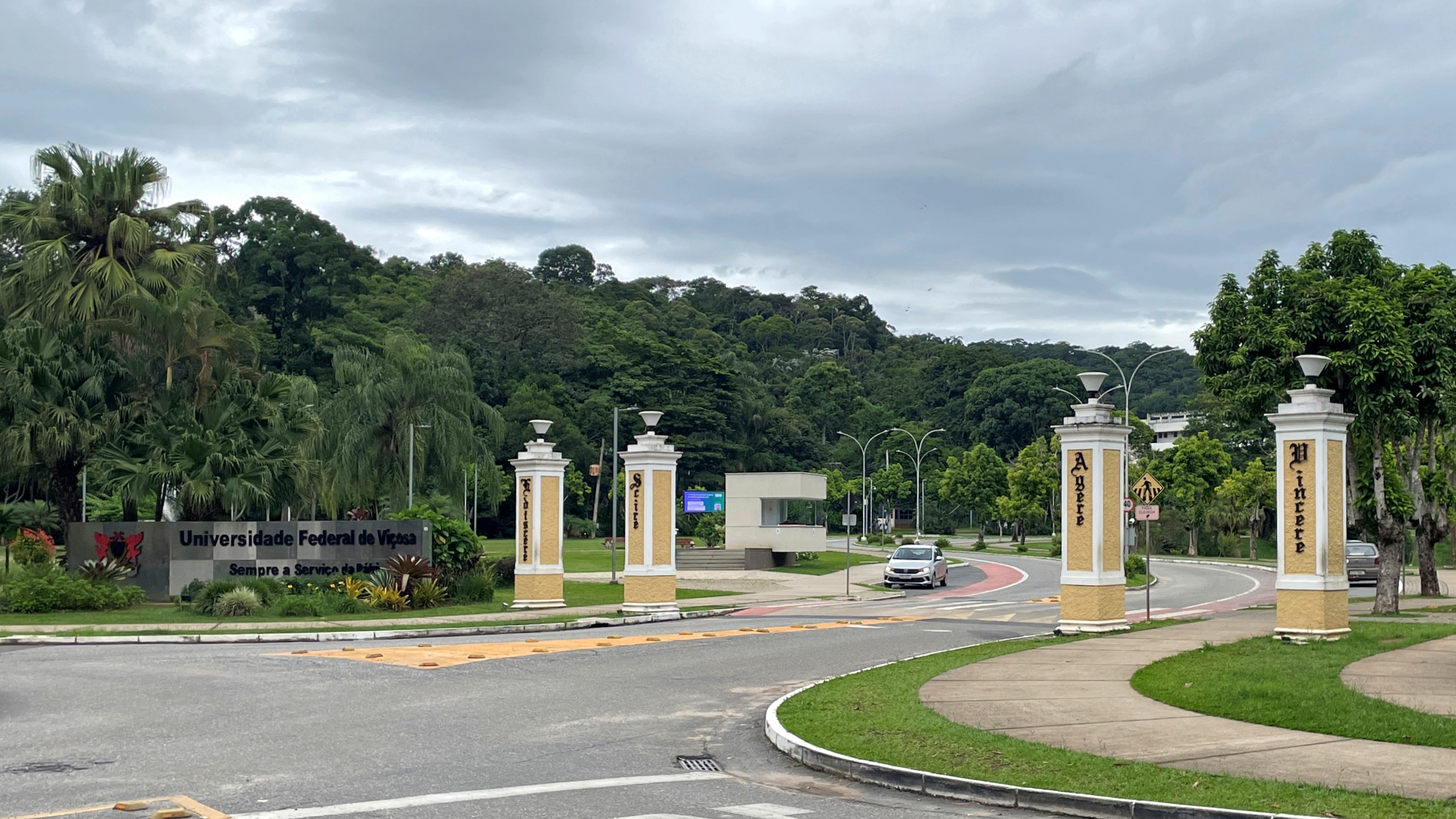
Four pilasters that demarcate the main entry of the campus

The main entry from UFV's Viçosa campus is demarcated by four pilasters, each one with one part of UFV's motto written in: Ediscere, Scire, Agere, Vincere (to study, to know, to act, to win). The four initials of the motto's words form "ESAV", the abbreviation of "Escola Superior de Agricultura de Viçosa". The idea of having four pilasters as the gateway of the campus refers to Purdue University, old UFV's partner. According to the tradition, there are also four pilasters in the main gateways in the campuses of Rio Paranaíba and of Florestal.

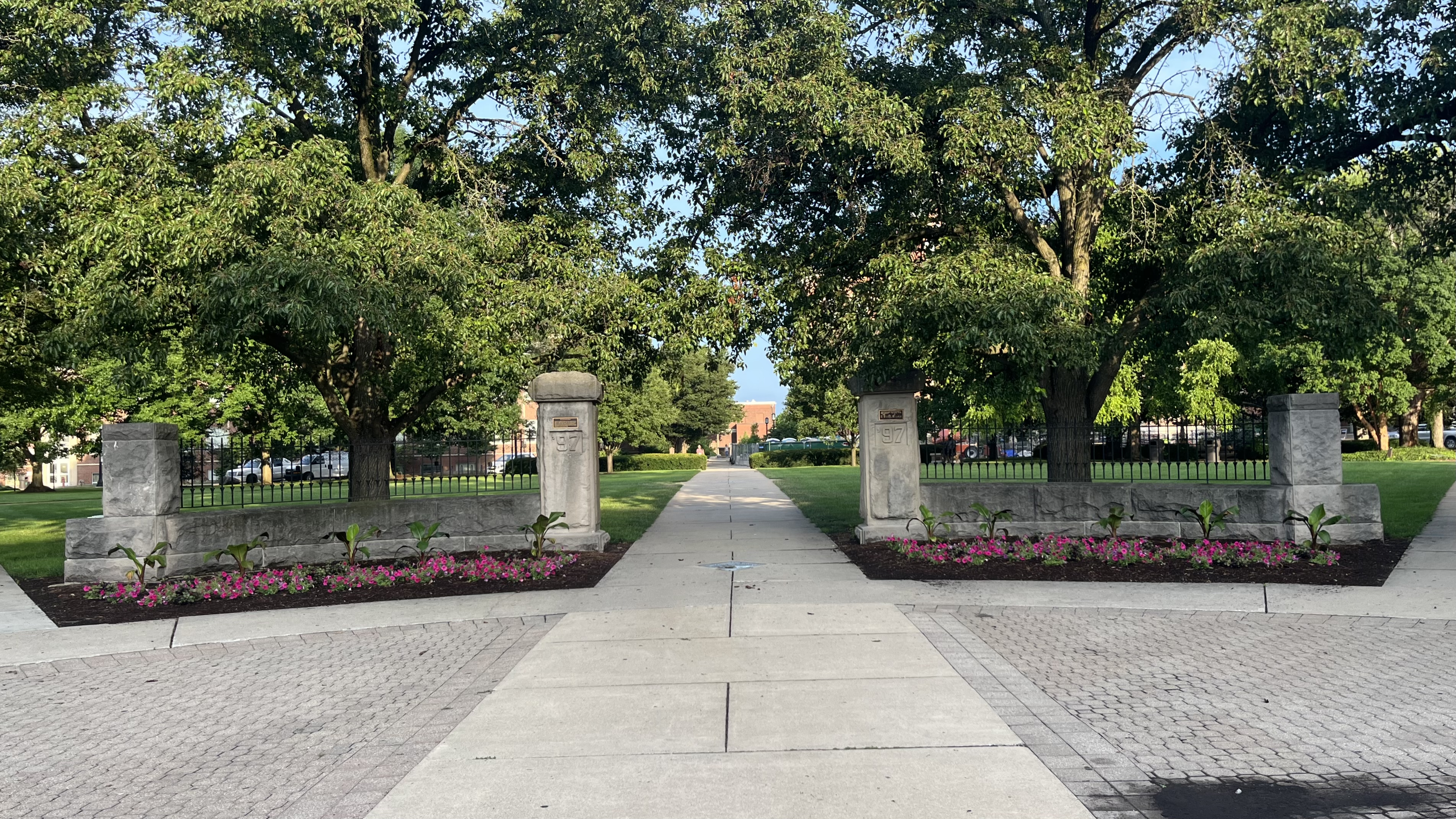
Four pilasters that were originally the main entry of Purdue University's campus, em West Lafayette.

==== Location ====
In 1921, a technical commission was established and designated to study the best location in the state to establish in it the academic institution, formed by Dr. Rolfs, with the Director de Agriculture of the Secretary of State, Dr. Álvaro da Silveira, and with the help of Dr. Arduino Bolivar and of Dr. Mário Monteiro Machado. The chosen place was the city of Viçosa where is located at the miner jungle zone, homeland of Arthur Bernardes.

"Progressively, it was manifested the success of constructing the School and today there can be only technical judgment those who want to steal from themselves the reality of concrete arguments"

— Bello Lisbôa (Directory of the School between 1929-1936) in conference in the year of 1935.

Bello Lisbôa (Directory of the School between 1929-1936) was critic when the integrity of the technical analysis that led Viçosa to be chosen as the headquarters city of the School, between the best local available in Minas Gerais, giving as a decisive criteria the establishment of the institution in Viçosa the origin of its godfather and founder Arthur Bernardes. With Viçosa approved by the decree number 5.806, de 30 de November de 1921 as the local basis, in 30 of March 1922 it was by decree established the Superior School of Agriculture and Veterinary.

=== Construction ===
Due to it not being vacancy the area destined to construction, together with the authorization of installation of the School, it was declared a declaration of expropriation of lands. With the goal of avoiding the taken of the agricultural lands by force, it was fitted Fernando of Mello Vianna, the General Procurator of the State of Minas Gerais, the attempt of friendly acquisition of those lands. Despite the resistance of the proprietaries reported by the procurator, it was bought 453 hectares, by the price of 294:800$000 Reis, that constituted the initial nucleus of the current UFV.

In 18 of January 1922, it began the preparations for the construction, that started in 10 of July 1922. The construction was marked by diverse problems about the missing of qualified workers; problems about the acquisition and transport of material, and the confuse and volatile politics theater of that period became big obstacles to the diverse engineers that worked as managers of that project. The inauguration of the activities happened in 28 of August 1926, after the conclusion of the main building of the campus, currently called Edifice Arthur Bernardes, also known as "Big Bernard", with the presence of its founder Republic President Arthur Bernardes (president during 1922-1926). An outdoor mass was celebrated in the lateral staircase of the building, followed by a blessing to the building, realized by the Monsignor Alipio de Oliveira, representative of the archbishop of Mariana.

=== Beginning of activities ===
Facade of the Arthur da Silva Bernardes Building, the main building of UFV.

In the beginning of its educational activities, the Superior School of Agriculture and Veterinary offered three types of courses: Elementary, which had a duration of 1 year; Middle, 2 years; and Superior, 3 years. The Elementary and Middle courses began on August 1, 1927; the Superior course had its first class given in the first semester of 1928. Before that, primary classes were given during the day to the sons of the laborers who were building the institution, due to the high incidence of illiteracy. In the night shift, the laborers also had classes. According to studies realized during the time when the construction was happening, more than 80% of the laborers were illiterate, with this number reduced to less than 10% in 1926.

==== Rural University of the State of Minas Gerais ====
With the goal of improving the institution, the Government of the State of Minas Gerais transformed it, in 1948, through the Law number 272, in Rural University of the State of Minas Gerais (UREMG), this university being composed by the Superior School of Agriculture, by the Superior School of Veterinary, by the Superior School of Domestic Sciences, by the School of Specialization (Post-graduation), by the Service of Experimentation and Research, and by the Service of Extension.

==== Federalization of the institution ====
In a deal with Edson Potsch Magalhães, rector of the Rural University of the State of Minas Gerais, the caeteensian Israel Pinheiro of Silva, Minas Gerais governor of that time, promoted the beginning of the federalization of the university. The initiative was immediately welcomed by the Ministry of Education that, by Decree-Law number 570, of 8 of May 1969, sanctioned by president Arthur da Costa e Silva, authorized the Executive Power to institute, by the form of Fundation [sic?], the Federal University of Viçosa - UFV. The act was consolidated by Decree number 64.825, of 15 of July 1969, that determined that UFV started to exist, as a legal entity, on August 1, 1969. The first rector of the institution was the professor Edson Potsch Magalhães, whose mandate lasted from July 15, 1969, to July 15, 1971.

This institution is a university in Brazil. UFV offers 47 different undergrad courses in many areas, including engineering, agronomy, medicine, veterinary medicine, animal husbandry, and other areas related to science. The university has a Graduate School, offering 36 Master's degree programs and 24 for at PhD level.

Viçosa has had a longstanding relationship with Purdue University (USA) and its College of Agriculture, which continues to this day. In the 1950s and 1960s, numerous members of Purdue's faculty stayed in Brazil for several years to help build and strengthen the program at Viçosa. Those that went include Ellsworth Christmas (former Purdue Professor of Agronomy), Jules Janick (Purdue Professor of Horticulture), Doug Knudson (Purdue Professor of Forestry), and D. Woods Thomas, former Associate Dean and Director of International Programs in Agriculture at Purdue University.

=== Exchange programs ===
In recent years, the university has had multiple exchange programs with universities in several countries, especially Latin America and African countries that speak Portuguese. There have also been exchange agreements with universities in the United States and Canada, through which UFV sends a Brazilian student to the University of Florida or the University of Georgia for each U.S. student sent to the Universidade Federal de Viçosa, for example. There is also an exchange program with the Netherlands "Living Lab Biobased Brazil" which is an exchange program between universities of applied science in the Netherlands and multiple universities in Brazil. The Office of International Affairs (DRI, Portuguese: Diretoria de Relações Internacionais) is responsible for managing these agreements.

=== Distinctions ===
UFV is recognized mainly by agrarian and exact sciences, recognized by the MEC (Ministry of Education, Portuguese: Ministério da Educação) as the 6th best university in Brazil based on the ENADE (National Student Performance Exam, Portuguese: Exame Nacional de Desempenho dos Estudantes) 2014 exam. It is considered one of the best universities in Brazil, and in the General Index of Institution Courses (IGC) made by the Ministry of Education in 2009 was selected as the 2nd best in Brazil and 1st in the state of Minas Gerais.

== See also ==
- Brazil University Rankings
- List of federal universities of Brazil
- Universities and Higher Education in Brazil
